

192001–192100 

|-bgcolor=#E9E9E9
| 192001 Raynatedford ||  ||  || December 2, 2005 || Kitt Peak || M. W. Buie || — || align=right | 3.6 km || 
|-id=002 bgcolor=#fefefe
| 192002 ||  || — || December 1, 2005 || Mount Lemmon || Mount Lemmon Survey || NYS || align=right | 1.1 km || 
|-id=003 bgcolor=#E9E9E9
| 192003 ||  || — || December 21, 2005 || Catalina || CSS || — || align=right | 1.8 km || 
|-id=004 bgcolor=#E9E9E9
| 192004 ||  || — || December 24, 2005 || Kitt Peak || Spacewatch || — || align=right | 1.8 km || 
|-id=005 bgcolor=#E9E9E9
| 192005 ||  || — || December 24, 2005 || Kitt Peak || Spacewatch || — || align=right | 1.3 km || 
|-id=006 bgcolor=#E9E9E9
| 192006 ||  || — || December 24, 2005 || Kitt Peak || Spacewatch || — || align=right | 1.7 km || 
|-id=007 bgcolor=#E9E9E9
| 192007 ||  || — || December 24, 2005 || Kitt Peak || Spacewatch || — || align=right | 2.3 km || 
|-id=008 bgcolor=#fefefe
| 192008 ||  || — || December 25, 2005 || Kitt Peak || Spacewatch || NYS || align=right | 1.2 km || 
|-id=009 bgcolor=#fefefe
| 192009 ||  || — || December 21, 2005 || Kitt Peak || Spacewatch || — || align=right data-sort-value="0.96" | 960 m || 
|-id=010 bgcolor=#E9E9E9
| 192010 ||  || — || December 22, 2005 || Kitt Peak || Spacewatch || — || align=right | 1.8 km || 
|-id=011 bgcolor=#d6d6d6
| 192011 ||  || — || December 24, 2005 || Kitt Peak || Spacewatch || — || align=right | 3.7 km || 
|-id=012 bgcolor=#E9E9E9
| 192012 ||  || — || December 22, 2005 || Kitt Peak || Spacewatch || — || align=right | 2.1 km || 
|-id=013 bgcolor=#E9E9E9
| 192013 ||  || — || December 24, 2005 || Kitt Peak || Spacewatch || — || align=right | 4.0 km || 
|-id=014 bgcolor=#E9E9E9
| 192014 ||  || — || December 25, 2005 || Kitt Peak || Spacewatch || — || align=right | 2.8 km || 
|-id=015 bgcolor=#E9E9E9
| 192015 ||  || — || December 27, 2005 || Mount Lemmon || Mount Lemmon Survey || — || align=right | 1.2 km || 
|-id=016 bgcolor=#fefefe
| 192016 ||  || — || December 24, 2005 || Kitt Peak || Spacewatch || V || align=right data-sort-value="0.82" | 820 m || 
|-id=017 bgcolor=#d6d6d6
| 192017 ||  || — || December 24, 2005 || Kitt Peak || Spacewatch || — || align=right | 7.1 km || 
|-id=018 bgcolor=#E9E9E9
| 192018 ||  || — || December 25, 2005 || Kitt Peak || Spacewatch || MRX || align=right | 1.8 km || 
|-id=019 bgcolor=#fefefe
| 192019 ||  || — || December 25, 2005 || Kitt Peak || Spacewatch || NYS || align=right | 1.3 km || 
|-id=020 bgcolor=#E9E9E9
| 192020 ||  || — || December 25, 2005 || Kitt Peak || Spacewatch || — || align=right | 1.3 km || 
|-id=021 bgcolor=#E9E9E9
| 192021 ||  || — || December 25, 2005 || Kitt Peak || Spacewatch || — || align=right | 2.9 km || 
|-id=022 bgcolor=#fefefe
| 192022 ||  || — || December 27, 2005 || Kitt Peak || Spacewatch || NYS || align=right | 1.4 km || 
|-id=023 bgcolor=#E9E9E9
| 192023 ||  || — || December 22, 2005 || Kitt Peak || Spacewatch || — || align=right | 3.4 km || 
|-id=024 bgcolor=#E9E9E9
| 192024 ||  || — || December 22, 2005 || Kitt Peak || Spacewatch || AGN || align=right | 1.8 km || 
|-id=025 bgcolor=#E9E9E9
| 192025 ||  || — || December 30, 2005 || Kitt Peak || Spacewatch || AGN || align=right | 2.0 km || 
|-id=026 bgcolor=#E9E9E9
| 192026 ||  || — || December 30, 2005 || Kitt Peak || Spacewatch || — || align=right | 2.2 km || 
|-id=027 bgcolor=#E9E9E9
| 192027 ||  || — || December 22, 2005 || Kitt Peak || Spacewatch || — || align=right | 2.8 km || 
|-id=028 bgcolor=#E9E9E9
| 192028 ||  || — || December 28, 2005 || Catalina || CSS || EUN || align=right | 2.1 km || 
|-id=029 bgcolor=#E9E9E9
| 192029 ||  || — || December 28, 2005 || Catalina || CSS || — || align=right | 2.3 km || 
|-id=030 bgcolor=#E9E9E9
| 192030 ||  || — || December 25, 2005 || Kitt Peak || Spacewatch || XIZ || align=right | 2.4 km || 
|-id=031 bgcolor=#E9E9E9
| 192031 ||  || — || December 25, 2005 || Kitt Peak || Spacewatch || — || align=right | 2.5 km || 
|-id=032 bgcolor=#E9E9E9
| 192032 ||  || — || December 30, 2005 || Mount Lemmon || Mount Lemmon Survey || PAD || align=right | 3.9 km || 
|-id=033 bgcolor=#fefefe
| 192033 ||  || — || December 30, 2005 || Mount Lemmon || Mount Lemmon Survey || NYS || align=right | 1.1 km || 
|-id=034 bgcolor=#E9E9E9
| 192034 ||  || — || December 25, 2005 || Mount Lemmon || Mount Lemmon Survey || MAR || align=right | 1.4 km || 
|-id=035 bgcolor=#E9E9E9
| 192035 ||  || — || December 30, 2005 || Mount Lemmon || Mount Lemmon Survey || — || align=right | 1.7 km || 
|-id=036 bgcolor=#d6d6d6
| 192036 ||  || — || December 30, 2005 || Mount Lemmon || Mount Lemmon Survey || — || align=right | 4.6 km || 
|-id=037 bgcolor=#E9E9E9
| 192037 ||  || — || December 25, 2005 || Catalina || CSS || — || align=right | 2.4 km || 
|-id=038 bgcolor=#E9E9E9
| 192038 ||  || — || December 25, 2005 || Mount Lemmon || Mount Lemmon Survey || — || align=right | 4.7 km || 
|-id=039 bgcolor=#E9E9E9
| 192039 ||  || — || December 30, 2005 || Kitt Peak || Spacewatch || — || align=right | 3.6 km || 
|-id=040 bgcolor=#E9E9E9
| 192040 ||  || — || December 25, 2005 || Catalina || CSS || — || align=right | 2.2 km || 
|-id=041 bgcolor=#E9E9E9
| 192041 ||  || — || December 29, 2005 || Socorro || LINEAR || MAR || align=right | 1.9 km || 
|-id=042 bgcolor=#E9E9E9
| 192042 ||  || — || January 4, 2006 || Kitt Peak || Spacewatch || — || align=right | 1.5 km || 
|-id=043 bgcolor=#fefefe
| 192043 ||  || — || January 5, 2006 || Mount Lemmon || Mount Lemmon Survey || MAS || align=right | 1.1 km || 
|-id=044 bgcolor=#d6d6d6
| 192044 ||  || — || January 5, 2006 || Catalina || CSS || — || align=right | 5.0 km || 
|-id=045 bgcolor=#E9E9E9
| 192045 ||  || — || January 5, 2006 || Kitt Peak || Spacewatch || — || align=right | 4.5 km || 
|-id=046 bgcolor=#fefefe
| 192046 ||  || — || January 7, 2006 || Anderson Mesa || LONEOS || — || align=right | 1.7 km || 
|-id=047 bgcolor=#E9E9E9
| 192047 ||  || — || January 5, 2006 || Kitt Peak || Spacewatch || — || align=right | 3.6 km || 
|-id=048 bgcolor=#d6d6d6
| 192048 ||  || — || January 11, 2006 || Anderson Mesa || LONEOS || — || align=right | 6.5 km || 
|-id=049 bgcolor=#fefefe
| 192049 ||  || — || January 7, 2006 || Mount Lemmon || Mount Lemmon Survey || — || align=right | 1.3 km || 
|-id=050 bgcolor=#E9E9E9
| 192050 ||  || — || January 7, 2006 || Kitt Peak || Spacewatch || — || align=right | 3.2 km || 
|-id=051 bgcolor=#E9E9E9
| 192051 ||  || — || January 9, 2006 || Kitt Peak || Spacewatch || GEF || align=right | 2.0 km || 
|-id=052 bgcolor=#fefefe
| 192052 ||  || — || January 10, 2006 || Catalina || CSS || — || align=right | 1.7 km || 
|-id=053 bgcolor=#E9E9E9
| 192053 ||  || — || January 10, 2006 || Catalina || CSS || — || align=right | 2.6 km || 
|-id=054 bgcolor=#d6d6d6
| 192054 ||  || — || January 21, 2006 || Kitt Peak || Spacewatch || — || align=right | 3.2 km || 
|-id=055 bgcolor=#E9E9E9
| 192055 ||  || — || January 23, 2006 || Kitt Peak || Spacewatch || — || align=right | 2.9 km || 
|-id=056 bgcolor=#E9E9E9
| 192056 ||  || — || January 21, 2006 || Kitt Peak || Spacewatch || — || align=right | 3.1 km || 
|-id=057 bgcolor=#E9E9E9
| 192057 ||  || — || January 22, 2006 || Anderson Mesa || LONEOS || — || align=right | 3.7 km || 
|-id=058 bgcolor=#d6d6d6
| 192058 ||  || — || January 23, 2006 || Kitt Peak || Spacewatch || KOR || align=right | 1.8 km || 
|-id=059 bgcolor=#E9E9E9
| 192059 ||  || — || January 23, 2006 || Mount Lemmon || Mount Lemmon Survey || — || align=right | 2.6 km || 
|-id=060 bgcolor=#E9E9E9
| 192060 ||  || — || January 23, 2006 || Kitt Peak || Spacewatch || AGN || align=right | 1.8 km || 
|-id=061 bgcolor=#E9E9E9
| 192061 ||  || — || January 26, 2006 || Kitt Peak || Spacewatch || — || align=right | 3.4 km || 
|-id=062 bgcolor=#d6d6d6
| 192062 ||  || — || January 23, 2006 || Kitt Peak || Spacewatch || — || align=right | 3.7 km || 
|-id=063 bgcolor=#d6d6d6
| 192063 ||  || — || January 24, 2006 || Socorro || LINEAR || — || align=right | 6.2 km || 
|-id=064 bgcolor=#E9E9E9
| 192064 ||  || — || January 25, 2006 || Kitt Peak || Spacewatch || — || align=right | 2.0 km || 
|-id=065 bgcolor=#fefefe
| 192065 ||  || — || January 25, 2006 || Kitt Peak || Spacewatch || MAS || align=right | 1.2 km || 
|-id=066 bgcolor=#d6d6d6
| 192066 ||  || — || January 25, 2006 || Kitt Peak || Spacewatch || EOS || align=right | 2.9 km || 
|-id=067 bgcolor=#d6d6d6
| 192067 ||  || — || January 25, 2006 || Kitt Peak || Spacewatch || KOR || align=right | 2.1 km || 
|-id=068 bgcolor=#d6d6d6
| 192068 ||  || — || January 26, 2006 || Kitt Peak || Spacewatch || — || align=right | 2.7 km || 
|-id=069 bgcolor=#E9E9E9
| 192069 ||  || — || January 26, 2006 || Kitt Peak || Spacewatch || WIT || align=right | 2.0 km || 
|-id=070 bgcolor=#d6d6d6
| 192070 ||  || — || January 26, 2006 || Kitt Peak || Spacewatch || KOR || align=right | 2.2 km || 
|-id=071 bgcolor=#d6d6d6
| 192071 ||  || — || January 26, 2006 || Mount Lemmon || Mount Lemmon Survey || KOR || align=right | 2.1 km || 
|-id=072 bgcolor=#E9E9E9
| 192072 ||  || — || January 27, 2006 || Kitt Peak || Spacewatch || — || align=right | 4.5 km || 
|-id=073 bgcolor=#d6d6d6
| 192073 ||  || — || January 25, 2006 || Kitt Peak || Spacewatch || — || align=right | 3.7 km || 
|-id=074 bgcolor=#E9E9E9
| 192074 ||  || — || January 25, 2006 || Kitt Peak || Spacewatch || AST || align=right | 3.4 km || 
|-id=075 bgcolor=#E9E9E9
| 192075 ||  || — || January 23, 2006 || Mount Lemmon || Mount Lemmon Survey || — || align=right | 3.2 km || 
|-id=076 bgcolor=#d6d6d6
| 192076 ||  || — || January 23, 2006 || Mount Lemmon || Mount Lemmon Survey || — || align=right | 3.4 km || 
|-id=077 bgcolor=#d6d6d6
| 192077 ||  || — || January 26, 2006 || Kitt Peak || Spacewatch || — || align=right | 3.1 km || 
|-id=078 bgcolor=#d6d6d6
| 192078 ||  || — || January 26, 2006 || Kitt Peak || Spacewatch || THM || align=right | 3.8 km || 
|-id=079 bgcolor=#d6d6d6
| 192079 ||  || — || January 26, 2006 || Kitt Peak || Spacewatch || — || align=right | 4.4 km || 
|-id=080 bgcolor=#E9E9E9
| 192080 ||  || — || January 28, 2006 || Mount Lemmon || Mount Lemmon Survey || — || align=right | 2.0 km || 
|-id=081 bgcolor=#d6d6d6
| 192081 ||  || — || January 26, 2006 || Kitt Peak || Spacewatch || — || align=right | 4.9 km || 
|-id=082 bgcolor=#E9E9E9
| 192082 ||  || — || January 30, 2006 || 7300 Observatory || W. K. Y. Yeung || HOF || align=right | 3.6 km || 
|-id=083 bgcolor=#E9E9E9
| 192083 ||  || — || January 25, 2006 || Kitt Peak || Spacewatch || HOF || align=right | 4.6 km || 
|-id=084 bgcolor=#d6d6d6
| 192084 ||  || — || January 25, 2006 || Kitt Peak || Spacewatch || — || align=right | 7.0 km || 
|-id=085 bgcolor=#E9E9E9
| 192085 ||  || — || January 26, 2006 || Mount Lemmon || Mount Lemmon Survey || WIT || align=right | 1.7 km || 
|-id=086 bgcolor=#E9E9E9
| 192086 ||  || — || January 26, 2006 || Mount Lemmon || Mount Lemmon Survey || WIT || align=right | 1.8 km || 
|-id=087 bgcolor=#d6d6d6
| 192087 ||  || — || January 26, 2006 || Mount Lemmon || Mount Lemmon Survey || — || align=right | 4.4 km || 
|-id=088 bgcolor=#d6d6d6
| 192088 ||  || — || January 26, 2006 || Mount Lemmon || Mount Lemmon Survey || — || align=right | 3.9 km || 
|-id=089 bgcolor=#E9E9E9
| 192089 ||  || — || January 27, 2006 || Anderson Mesa || LONEOS || — || align=right | 4.1 km || 
|-id=090 bgcolor=#E9E9E9
| 192090 ||  || — || January 30, 2006 || Kitt Peak || Spacewatch || — || align=right | 4.2 km || 
|-id=091 bgcolor=#E9E9E9
| 192091 ||  || — || January 30, 2006 || Kitt Peak || Spacewatch || — || align=right | 3.7 km || 
|-id=092 bgcolor=#d6d6d6
| 192092 ||  || — || January 30, 2006 || Kitt Peak || Spacewatch || THM || align=right | 3.5 km || 
|-id=093 bgcolor=#fefefe
| 192093 ||  || — || January 31, 2006 || Kitt Peak || Spacewatch || MAS || align=right | 1.1 km || 
|-id=094 bgcolor=#d6d6d6
| 192094 ||  || — || January 31, 2006 || Kitt Peak || Spacewatch || KOR || align=right | 2.1 km || 
|-id=095 bgcolor=#E9E9E9
| 192095 ||  || — || January 31, 2006 || Mount Lemmon || Mount Lemmon Survey || AGN || align=right | 1.9 km || 
|-id=096 bgcolor=#E9E9E9
| 192096 ||  || — || January 31, 2006 || Catalina || CSS || — || align=right | 2.6 km || 
|-id=097 bgcolor=#d6d6d6
| 192097 ||  || — || January 31, 2006 || Catalina || CSS || EUP || align=right | 5.8 km || 
|-id=098 bgcolor=#d6d6d6
| 192098 ||  || — || January 31, 2006 || Kitt Peak || Spacewatch || KOR || align=right | 1.9 km || 
|-id=099 bgcolor=#d6d6d6
| 192099 ||  || — || January 31, 2006 || Kitt Peak || Spacewatch || KOR || align=right | 1.9 km || 
|-id=100 bgcolor=#fefefe
| 192100 ||  || — || January 27, 2006 || Catalina || CSS || — || align=right | 3.6 km || 
|}

192101–192200 

|-bgcolor=#d6d6d6
| 192101 ||  || — || January 31, 2006 || Catalina || CSS || — || align=right | 4.3 km || 
|-id=102 bgcolor=#d6d6d6
| 192102 ||  || — || January 26, 2006 || Kitt Peak || Spacewatch || K-2 || align=right | 2.3 km || 
|-id=103 bgcolor=#E9E9E9
| 192103 ||  || — || February 1, 2006 || Kitt Peak || Spacewatch || — || align=right | 5.4 km || 
|-id=104 bgcolor=#E9E9E9
| 192104 ||  || — || February 1, 2006 || Kitt Peak || Spacewatch || — || align=right | 3.4 km || 
|-id=105 bgcolor=#E9E9E9
| 192105 ||  || — || February 1, 2006 || Kitt Peak || Spacewatch || AGN || align=right | 1.9 km || 
|-id=106 bgcolor=#d6d6d6
| 192106 ||  || — || February 1, 2006 || Kitt Peak || Spacewatch || — || align=right | 4.9 km || 
|-id=107 bgcolor=#E9E9E9
| 192107 ||  || — || February 2, 2006 || Kitt Peak || Spacewatch || — || align=right | 4.2 km || 
|-id=108 bgcolor=#E9E9E9
| 192108 ||  || — || February 2, 2006 || Kitt Peak || Spacewatch || — || align=right | 2.3 km || 
|-id=109 bgcolor=#d6d6d6
| 192109 ||  || — || February 2, 2006 || Kitt Peak || Spacewatch || — || align=right | 6.2 km || 
|-id=110 bgcolor=#d6d6d6
| 192110 ||  || — || February 2, 2006 || Mount Lemmon || Mount Lemmon Survey || — || align=right | 4.1 km || 
|-id=111 bgcolor=#E9E9E9
| 192111 ||  || — || February 3, 2006 || Kitt Peak || Spacewatch || — || align=right | 2.6 km || 
|-id=112 bgcolor=#E9E9E9
| 192112 ||  || — || February 4, 2006 || Kitt Peak || Spacewatch || — || align=right | 3.6 km || 
|-id=113 bgcolor=#E9E9E9
| 192113 ||  || — || February 4, 2006 || Mount Lemmon || Mount Lemmon Survey || — || align=right | 3.2 km || 
|-id=114 bgcolor=#d6d6d6
| 192114 ||  || — || February 2, 2006 || Kitt Peak || Spacewatch || — || align=right | 4.5 km || 
|-id=115 bgcolor=#E9E9E9
| 192115 ||  || — || February 20, 2006 || Kitt Peak || Spacewatch || — || align=right | 2.6 km || 
|-id=116 bgcolor=#d6d6d6
| 192116 ||  || — || February 21, 2006 || Catalina || CSS || — || align=right | 4.5 km || 
|-id=117 bgcolor=#d6d6d6
| 192117 ||  || — || February 20, 2006 || Kitt Peak || Spacewatch || — || align=right | 2.8 km || 
|-id=118 bgcolor=#d6d6d6
| 192118 ||  || — || February 20, 2006 || Kitt Peak || Spacewatch || — || align=right | 4.3 km || 
|-id=119 bgcolor=#d6d6d6
| 192119 ||  || — || February 20, 2006 || Mount Lemmon || Mount Lemmon Survey || — || align=right | 3.6 km || 
|-id=120 bgcolor=#d6d6d6
| 192120 ||  || — || February 20, 2006 || Kitt Peak || Spacewatch || — || align=right | 3.3 km || 
|-id=121 bgcolor=#d6d6d6
| 192121 ||  || — || February 20, 2006 || Kitt Peak || Spacewatch || HYG || align=right | 3.8 km || 
|-id=122 bgcolor=#d6d6d6
| 192122 ||  || — || February 24, 2006 || Kitt Peak || Spacewatch || EOS || align=right | 2.6 km || 
|-id=123 bgcolor=#E9E9E9
| 192123 ||  || — || February 24, 2006 || Mount Lemmon || Mount Lemmon Survey || — || align=right | 3.6 km || 
|-id=124 bgcolor=#d6d6d6
| 192124 ||  || — || February 24, 2006 || Mount Lemmon || Mount Lemmon Survey || — || align=right | 3.1 km || 
|-id=125 bgcolor=#d6d6d6
| 192125 ||  || — || February 20, 2006 || Catalina || CSS || KOR || align=right | 2.7 km || 
|-id=126 bgcolor=#d6d6d6
| 192126 ||  || — || February 23, 2006 || Anderson Mesa || LONEOS || — || align=right | 3.6 km || 
|-id=127 bgcolor=#E9E9E9
| 192127 ||  || — || February 24, 2006 || Kitt Peak || Spacewatch || — || align=right | 2.4 km || 
|-id=128 bgcolor=#E9E9E9
| 192128 ||  || — || February 24, 2006 || Kitt Peak || Spacewatch || — || align=right | 1.5 km || 
|-id=129 bgcolor=#d6d6d6
| 192129 ||  || — || February 25, 2006 || Kitt Peak || Spacewatch || — || align=right | 4.0 km || 
|-id=130 bgcolor=#E9E9E9
| 192130 ||  || — || February 25, 2006 || Kitt Peak || Spacewatch || — || align=right | 3.1 km || 
|-id=131 bgcolor=#E9E9E9
| 192131 ||  || — || February 27, 2006 || Kitt Peak || Spacewatch || — || align=right | 3.1 km || 
|-id=132 bgcolor=#d6d6d6
| 192132 ||  || — || February 21, 2006 || Catalina || CSS || — || align=right | 4.9 km || 
|-id=133 bgcolor=#d6d6d6
| 192133 ||  || — || February 22, 2006 || Catalina || CSS || — || align=right | 4.7 km || 
|-id=134 bgcolor=#E9E9E9
| 192134 ||  || — || February 24, 2006 || Mount Lemmon || Mount Lemmon Survey || — || align=right | 1.4 km || 
|-id=135 bgcolor=#d6d6d6
| 192135 ||  || — || February 27, 2006 || Kitt Peak || Spacewatch || — || align=right | 3.2 km || 
|-id=136 bgcolor=#d6d6d6
| 192136 ||  || — || February 27, 2006 || Kitt Peak || Spacewatch || — || align=right | 4.6 km || 
|-id=137 bgcolor=#d6d6d6
| 192137 ||  || — || February 27, 2006 || Kitt Peak || Spacewatch || — || align=right | 5.1 km || 
|-id=138 bgcolor=#d6d6d6
| 192138 ||  || — || February 20, 2006 || Kitt Peak || Spacewatch || — || align=right | 3.7 km || 
|-id=139 bgcolor=#d6d6d6
| 192139 ||  || — || February 25, 2006 || Anderson Mesa || LONEOS || — || align=right | 5.3 km || 
|-id=140 bgcolor=#d6d6d6
| 192140 ||  || — || March 3, 2006 || Kitt Peak || Spacewatch || — || align=right | 6.0 km || 
|-id=141 bgcolor=#d6d6d6
| 192141 ||  || — || March 4, 2006 || Kitt Peak || Spacewatch || — || align=right | 4.5 km || 
|-id=142 bgcolor=#d6d6d6
| 192142 ||  || — || March 23, 2006 || Catalina || CSS || — || align=right | 7.4 km || 
|-id=143 bgcolor=#E9E9E9
| 192143 ||  || — || March 23, 2006 || Mount Lemmon || Mount Lemmon Survey || — || align=right | 2.8 km || 
|-id=144 bgcolor=#d6d6d6
| 192144 ||  || — || March 24, 2006 || RAS || A. Lowe || — || align=right | 6.9 km || 
|-id=145 bgcolor=#E9E9E9
| 192145 ||  || — || March 24, 2006 || Mount Lemmon || Mount Lemmon Survey || AGN || align=right | 2.2 km || 
|-id=146 bgcolor=#d6d6d6
| 192146 ||  || — || March 24, 2006 || Mount Lemmon || Mount Lemmon Survey || URS || align=right | 5.8 km || 
|-id=147 bgcolor=#d6d6d6
| 192147 ||  || — || March 26, 2006 || Kitt Peak || Spacewatch || KOR || align=right | 2.2 km || 
|-id=148 bgcolor=#d6d6d6
| 192148 ||  || — || March 29, 2006 || Socorro || LINEAR || — || align=right | 4.7 km || 
|-id=149 bgcolor=#d6d6d6
| 192149 ||  || — || March 24, 2006 || Anderson Mesa || LONEOS || — || align=right | 5.7 km || 
|-id=150 bgcolor=#d6d6d6
| 192150 ||  || — || April 6, 2006 || Socorro || LINEAR || — || align=right | 6.2 km || 
|-id=151 bgcolor=#d6d6d6
| 192151 ||  || — || April 19, 2006 || Catalina || CSS || ALA || align=right | 8.6 km || 
|-id=152 bgcolor=#E9E9E9
| 192152 ||  || — || April 19, 2006 || Palomar || NEAT || — || align=right | 5.0 km || 
|-id=153 bgcolor=#d6d6d6
| 192153 ||  || — || April 19, 2006 || Kitt Peak || Spacewatch || — || align=right | 4.3 km || 
|-id=154 bgcolor=#d6d6d6
| 192154 ||  || — || April 19, 2006 || Anderson Mesa || LONEOS || — || align=right | 8.4 km || 
|-id=155 bgcolor=#d6d6d6
| 192155 Hargittai ||  ||  || April 21, 2006 || Piszkéstető || K. Sárneczky || — || align=right | 3.1 km || 
|-id=156 bgcolor=#E9E9E9
| 192156 ||  || — || April 23, 2006 || Socorro || LINEAR || — || align=right | 6.7 km || 
|-id=157 bgcolor=#E9E9E9
| 192157 ||  || — || November 13, 2006 || San Marcello || Pistoia Mountains Obs. || — || align=right | 2.4 km || 
|-id=158 bgcolor=#fefefe
| 192158 Christian ||  ||  || December 14, 2006 || Wildberg || R. Apitzsch || H || align=right data-sort-value="0.85" | 850 m || 
|-id=159 bgcolor=#fefefe
| 192159 ||  || — || January 17, 2007 || Catalina || CSS || H || align=right | 1.2 km || 
|-id=160 bgcolor=#E9E9E9
| 192160 ||  || — || January 24, 2007 || Nyukasa || Mount Nyukasa Stn. || HOF || align=right | 3.8 km || 
|-id=161 bgcolor=#E9E9E9
| 192161 ||  || — || February 6, 2007 || Mount Lemmon || Mount Lemmon Survey || — || align=right | 1.3 km || 
|-id=162 bgcolor=#fefefe
| 192162 ||  || — || February 7, 2007 || Kitt Peak || Spacewatch || — || align=right | 1.8 km || 
|-id=163 bgcolor=#fefefe
| 192163 ||  || — || February 7, 2007 || Mount Lemmon || Mount Lemmon Survey || NYS || align=right | 1.0 km || 
|-id=164 bgcolor=#fefefe
| 192164 ||  || — || February 17, 2007 || Kitt Peak || Spacewatch || V || align=right data-sort-value="0.92" | 920 m || 
|-id=165 bgcolor=#fefefe
| 192165 ||  || — || February 16, 2007 || Palomar || NEAT || — || align=right | 1.3 km || 
|-id=166 bgcolor=#fefefe
| 192166 ||  || — || February 17, 2007 || Kitt Peak || Spacewatch || EUT || align=right data-sort-value="0.97" | 970 m || 
|-id=167 bgcolor=#fefefe
| 192167 ||  || — || February 17, 2007 || Kitt Peak || Spacewatch || — || align=right | 1.5 km || 
|-id=168 bgcolor=#fefefe
| 192168 ||  || — || February 19, 2007 || Mount Lemmon || Mount Lemmon Survey || — || align=right data-sort-value="0.93" | 930 m || 
|-id=169 bgcolor=#fefefe
| 192169 ||  || — || February 21, 2007 || Kitt Peak || Spacewatch || — || align=right | 1.4 km || 
|-id=170 bgcolor=#fefefe
| 192170 ||  || — || February 23, 2007 || Kitt Peak || Spacewatch || — || align=right | 1.3 km || 
|-id=171 bgcolor=#fefefe
| 192171 ||  || — || February 24, 2007 || Socorro || LINEAR || — || align=right | 2.4 km || 
|-id=172 bgcolor=#fefefe
| 192172 ||  || — || February 17, 2007 || Kitt Peak || Spacewatch || — || align=right data-sort-value="0.95" | 950 m || 
|-id=173 bgcolor=#E9E9E9
| 192173 ||  || — || March 9, 2007 || Kitt Peak || Spacewatch || — || align=right | 1.6 km || 
|-id=174 bgcolor=#fefefe
| 192174 ||  || — || March 10, 2007 || Palomar || NEAT || — || align=right | 1.5 km || 
|-id=175 bgcolor=#fefefe
| 192175 ||  || — || March 10, 2007 || Kitt Peak || Spacewatch || — || align=right | 1.1 km || 
|-id=176 bgcolor=#fefefe
| 192176 ||  || — || March 12, 2007 || Mount Lemmon || Mount Lemmon Survey || V || align=right data-sort-value="0.99" | 990 m || 
|-id=177 bgcolor=#fefefe
| 192177 ||  || — || March 14, 2007 || Kitt Peak || Spacewatch || NYS || align=right | 2.0 km || 
|-id=178 bgcolor=#E9E9E9
| 192178 Lijieshou ||  ||  || March 10, 2007 || XuYi || PMO NEO || — || align=right | 1.8 km || 
|-id=179 bgcolor=#E9E9E9
| 192179 ||  || — || March 8, 2007 || Palomar || NEAT || — || align=right | 3.3 km || 
|-id=180 bgcolor=#E9E9E9
| 192180 ||  || — || March 14, 2007 || Siding Spring || SSS || — || align=right | 2.2 km || 
|-id=181 bgcolor=#fefefe
| 192181 ||  || — || March 12, 2007 || Kitt Peak || Spacewatch || KLI || align=right | 3.6 km || 
|-id=182 bgcolor=#E9E9E9
| 192182 ||  || — || March 11, 2007 || Mount Lemmon || Mount Lemmon Survey || — || align=right | 4.1 km || 
|-id=183 bgcolor=#fefefe
| 192183 ||  || — || March 17, 2007 || Anderson Mesa || LONEOS || — || align=right | 1.8 km || 
|-id=184 bgcolor=#E9E9E9
| 192184 ||  || — || March 25, 2007 || Catalina || CSS || — || align=right | 3.6 km || 
|-id=185 bgcolor=#fefefe
| 192185 ||  || — || March 18, 2007 || Kitt Peak || Spacewatch || FLO || align=right data-sort-value="0.93" | 930 m || 
|-id=186 bgcolor=#E9E9E9
| 192186 ||  || — || April 12, 2007 || Altschwendt || W. Ries || HOF || align=right | 3.1 km || 
|-id=187 bgcolor=#fefefe
| 192187 ||  || — || April 8, 2007 || Kitt Peak || Spacewatch || — || align=right data-sort-value="0.90" | 900 m || 
|-id=188 bgcolor=#fefefe
| 192188 ||  || — || April 8, 2007 || Siding Spring || SSS || — || align=right | 1.3 km || 
|-id=189 bgcolor=#d6d6d6
| 192189 ||  || — || April 11, 2007 || Kitt Peak || Spacewatch || — || align=right | 3.3 km || 
|-id=190 bgcolor=#d6d6d6
| 192190 ||  || — || April 11, 2007 || Catalina || CSS || — || align=right | 5.7 km || 
|-id=191 bgcolor=#d6d6d6
| 192191 ||  || — || April 14, 2007 || Kitt Peak || Spacewatch || THM || align=right | 3.8 km || 
|-id=192 bgcolor=#d6d6d6
| 192192 ||  || — || April 14, 2007 || Kitt Peak || Spacewatch || — || align=right | 3.3 km || 
|-id=193 bgcolor=#E9E9E9
| 192193 ||  || — || April 14, 2007 || Kitt Peak || Spacewatch || — || align=right | 4.0 km || 
|-id=194 bgcolor=#E9E9E9
| 192194 ||  || — || April 14, 2007 || Kitt Peak || Spacewatch || — || align=right | 1.9 km || 
|-id=195 bgcolor=#fefefe
| 192195 ||  || — || April 14, 2007 || Catalina || CSS || V || align=right | 1.0 km || 
|-id=196 bgcolor=#E9E9E9
| 192196 ||  || — || April 16, 2007 || Mount Lemmon || Mount Lemmon Survey || — || align=right | 1.3 km || 
|-id=197 bgcolor=#E9E9E9
| 192197 ||  || — || April 19, 2007 || Great Shefford || P. Birtwhistle || MRX || align=right | 1.7 km || 
|-id=198 bgcolor=#E9E9E9
| 192198 ||  || — || April 19, 2007 || Mount Lemmon || Mount Lemmon Survey || — || align=right | 2.0 km || 
|-id=199 bgcolor=#E9E9E9
| 192199 ||  || — || April 18, 2007 || Kitt Peak || Spacewatch || — || align=right | 1.8 km || 
|-id=200 bgcolor=#d6d6d6
| 192200 ||  || — || April 20, 2007 || Kitt Peak || Spacewatch || — || align=right | 4.7 km || 
|}

192201–192300 

|-bgcolor=#E9E9E9
| 192201 ||  || — || April 20, 2007 || Kitt Peak || Spacewatch || — || align=right | 1.2 km || 
|-id=202 bgcolor=#E9E9E9
| 192202 ||  || — || April 19, 2007 || Kitt Peak || Spacewatch || MRX || align=right | 1.5 km || 
|-id=203 bgcolor=#d6d6d6
| 192203 ||  || — || April 22, 2007 || Siding Spring || SSS || HIL3:2 || align=right | 9.6 km || 
|-id=204 bgcolor=#d6d6d6
| 192204 ||  || — || May 12, 2007 || Tiki || S. F. Hönig, N. Teamo || — || align=right | 3.3 km || 
|-id=205 bgcolor=#d6d6d6
| 192205 ||  || — || May 9, 2007 || Kitt Peak || Spacewatch || HYG || align=right | 5.1 km || 
|-id=206 bgcolor=#d6d6d6
| 192206 ||  || — || May 10, 2007 || Mount Lemmon || Mount Lemmon Survey || — || align=right | 2.9 km || 
|-id=207 bgcolor=#E9E9E9
| 192207 ||  || — || May 12, 2007 || Mount Lemmon || Mount Lemmon Survey || WIT || align=right | 1.3 km || 
|-id=208 bgcolor=#d6d6d6
| 192208 Tzu Chi ||  ||  || May 11, 2007 || Lulin Observatory || C.-Y. Shih, Q.-z. Ye || — || align=right | 6.8 km || 
|-id=209 bgcolor=#E9E9E9
| 192209 ||  || — || May 12, 2007 || Mount Lemmon || Mount Lemmon Survey || NEM || align=right | 2.9 km || 
|-id=210 bgcolor=#d6d6d6
| 192210 ||  || — || May 15, 2007 || Mount Lemmon || Mount Lemmon Survey || — || align=right | 4.9 km || 
|-id=211 bgcolor=#d6d6d6
| 192211 ||  || — || May 17, 2007 || Catalina || CSS || EOS || align=right | 4.2 km || 
|-id=212 bgcolor=#E9E9E9
| 192212 ||  || — || June 5, 2007 || Catalina || CSS || — || align=right | 3.2 km || 
|-id=213 bgcolor=#d6d6d6
| 192213 ||  || — || June 15, 2007 || Kitt Peak || Spacewatch || — || align=right | 4.4 km || 
|-id=214 bgcolor=#d6d6d6
| 192214 ||  || — || June 5, 2007 || Catalina || CSS || EOS || align=right | 4.4 km || 
|-id=215 bgcolor=#C2FFFF
| 192215 ||  || — || June 21, 2007 || Mount Lemmon || Mount Lemmon Survey || L4 || align=right | 12 km || 
|-id=216 bgcolor=#d6d6d6
| 192216 ||  || — || June 23, 2007 || Kitt Peak || Spacewatch || — || align=right | 5.1 km || 
|-id=217 bgcolor=#C2FFFF
| 192217 ||  || — || August 9, 2007 || Chante-Perdrix || Chante-Perdrix Obs. || L4 || align=right | 14 km || 
|-id=218 bgcolor=#C2FFFF
| 192218 ||  || — || August 10, 2007 || Kitt Peak || Spacewatch || L4 || align=right | 15 km || 
|-id=219 bgcolor=#d6d6d6
| 192219 ||  || — || September 3, 2007 || Catalina || CSS || — || align=right | 6.6 km || 
|-id=220 bgcolor=#C2FFFF
| 192220 Oicles ||  ||  || September 14, 2007 || Taunus || E. Schwab, R. Kling || L4 || align=right | 11 km || 
|-id=221 bgcolor=#C2FFFF
| 192221 ||  || — || September 5, 2007 || Siding Spring || SSS || L4 || align=right | 21 km || 
|-id=222 bgcolor=#C2FFFF
| 192222 ||  || — || September 15, 2007 || Catalina || CSS || L4 || align=right | 19 km || 
|-id=223 bgcolor=#C2FFFF
| 192223 ||  || — || November 3, 2007 || Mount Lemmon || Mount Lemmon Survey || L4 || align=right | 14 km || 
|-id=224 bgcolor=#C2FFFF
| 192224 ||  || — || November 4, 2007 || Mount Lemmon || Mount Lemmon Survey || L4 || align=right | 11 km || 
|-id=225 bgcolor=#E9E9E9
| 192225 ||  || — || November 18, 2007 || Mount Lemmon || Mount Lemmon Survey || — || align=right | 4.0 km || 
|-id=226 bgcolor=#d6d6d6
| 192226 ||  || — || January 15, 2008 || Kitt Peak || Spacewatch || — || align=right | 3.2 km || 
|-id=227 bgcolor=#d6d6d6
| 192227 ||  || — || January 13, 2008 || Catalina || CSS || — || align=right | 6.3 km || 
|-id=228 bgcolor=#d6d6d6
| 192228 ||  || — || January 30, 2008 || Kitt Peak || Spacewatch || KOR || align=right | 1.8 km || 
|-id=229 bgcolor=#E9E9E9
| 192229 ||  || — || February 3, 2008 || Kitt Peak || Spacewatch || — || align=right | 1.3 km || 
|-id=230 bgcolor=#fefefe
| 192230 ||  || — || February 2, 2008 || Kitt Peak || Spacewatch || V || align=right data-sort-value="0.70" | 700 m || 
|-id=231 bgcolor=#E9E9E9
| 192231 ||  || — || February 2, 2008 || Kitt Peak || Spacewatch || GEF || align=right | 1.9 km || 
|-id=232 bgcolor=#E9E9E9
| 192232 ||  || — || February 3, 2008 || Kitt Peak || Spacewatch || — || align=right | 2.3 km || 
|-id=233 bgcolor=#E9E9E9
| 192233 ||  || — || February 7, 2008 || Kitt Peak || Spacewatch || — || align=right | 3.5 km || 
|-id=234 bgcolor=#d6d6d6
| 192234 ||  || — || February 13, 2008 || Catalina || CSS || — || align=right | 4.1 km || 
|-id=235 bgcolor=#E9E9E9
| 192235 ||  || — || February 13, 2008 || Mount Lemmon || Mount Lemmon Survey || — || align=right | 2.3 km || 
|-id=236 bgcolor=#d6d6d6
| 192236 ||  || — || February 8, 2008 || Kitt Peak || Spacewatch || KOR || align=right | 1.9 km || 
|-id=237 bgcolor=#E9E9E9
| 192237 ||  || — || February 24, 2008 || Mount Lemmon || Mount Lemmon Survey || — || align=right | 3.0 km || 
|-id=238 bgcolor=#E9E9E9
| 192238 ||  || — || February 26, 2008 || Kitt Peak || Spacewatch || — || align=right | 1.8 km || 
|-id=239 bgcolor=#E9E9E9
| 192239 ||  || — || February 27, 2008 || Kitt Peak || Spacewatch || — || align=right | 1.2 km || 
|-id=240 bgcolor=#d6d6d6
| 192240 ||  || — || February 27, 2008 || Catalina || CSS || — || align=right | 4.3 km || 
|-id=241 bgcolor=#d6d6d6
| 192241 ||  || — || February 26, 2008 || Mount Lemmon || Mount Lemmon Survey || — || align=right | 5.9 km || 
|-id=242 bgcolor=#E9E9E9
| 192242 ||  || — || February 28, 2008 || Kitt Peak || Spacewatch || — || align=right | 1.3 km || 
|-id=243 bgcolor=#d6d6d6
| 192243 ||  || — || March 1, 2008 || Kitt Peak || Spacewatch || — || align=right | 4.0 km || 
|-id=244 bgcolor=#E9E9E9
| 192244 ||  || — || March 4, 2008 || Kitt Peak || Spacewatch || HNA || align=right | 3.4 km || 
|-id=245 bgcolor=#E9E9E9
| 192245 ||  || — || March 6, 2008 || Mount Lemmon || Mount Lemmon Survey || AGN || align=right | 1.4 km || 
|-id=246 bgcolor=#fefefe
| 192246 ||  || — || March 7, 2008 || Mount Lemmon || Mount Lemmon Survey || — || align=right | 1.3 km || 
|-id=247 bgcolor=#d6d6d6
| 192247 ||  || — || March 2, 2008 || Catalina || CSS || — || align=right | 3.9 km || 
|-id=248 bgcolor=#d6d6d6
| 192248 ||  || — || March 4, 2008 || Catalina || CSS || NAE || align=right | 4.7 km || 
|-id=249 bgcolor=#d6d6d6
| 192249 ||  || — || March 9, 2008 || Mount Lemmon || Mount Lemmon Survey || — || align=right | 3.5 km || 
|-id=250 bgcolor=#d6d6d6
| 192250 ||  || — || March 28, 2008 || Kitt Peak || Spacewatch || — || align=right | 2.9 km || 
|-id=251 bgcolor=#d6d6d6
| 192251 ||  || — || March 28, 2008 || Mount Lemmon || Mount Lemmon Survey || — || align=right | 3.2 km || 
|-id=252 bgcolor=#E9E9E9
| 192252 ||  || — || March 28, 2008 || Kitt Peak || Spacewatch || — || align=right | 3.2 km || 
|-id=253 bgcolor=#d6d6d6
| 192253 ||  || — || March 27, 2008 || Mount Lemmon || Mount Lemmon Survey || — || align=right | 3.2 km || 
|-id=254 bgcolor=#fefefe
| 192254 ||  || — || April 3, 2008 || Kitt Peak || Spacewatch || — || align=right | 1.1 km || 
|-id=255 bgcolor=#d6d6d6
| 192255 ||  || — || April 3, 2008 || Kitt Peak || Spacewatch || CHA || align=right | 3.8 km || 
|-id=256 bgcolor=#fefefe
| 192256 ||  || — || April 5, 2008 || Mount Lemmon || Mount Lemmon Survey || V || align=right data-sort-value="0.80" | 800 m || 
|-id=257 bgcolor=#d6d6d6
| 192257 ||  || — || April 5, 2008 || Catalina || CSS || EOS || align=right | 3.4 km || 
|-id=258 bgcolor=#E9E9E9
| 192258 ||  || — || April 7, 2008 || Mount Lemmon || Mount Lemmon Survey || — || align=right | 2.5 km || 
|-id=259 bgcolor=#E9E9E9
| 192259 ||  || — || April 12, 2008 || Catalina || CSS || DOR || align=right | 3.3 km || 
|-id=260 bgcolor=#E9E9E9
| 192260 ||  || — || April 4, 2008 || Catalina || CSS || — || align=right | 2.6 km || 
|-id=261 bgcolor=#d6d6d6
| 192261 ||  || — || April 24, 2008 || Kitt Peak || Spacewatch || — || align=right | 2.8 km || 
|-id=262 bgcolor=#C2FFFF
| 192262 ||  || — || April 24, 2008 || Kitt Peak || Spacewatch || L5 || align=right | 12 km || 
|-id=263 bgcolor=#E9E9E9
| 192263 ||  || — || April 25, 2008 || Catalina || CSS || — || align=right | 2.5 km || 
|-id=264 bgcolor=#fefefe
| 192264 ||  || — || April 28, 2008 || Socorro || LINEAR || — || align=right | 1.1 km || 
|-id=265 bgcolor=#fefefe
| 192265 ||  || — || May 27, 2008 || Kitt Peak || Spacewatch || — || align=right | 1.2 km || 
|-id=266 bgcolor=#fefefe
| 192266 ||  || — || May 29, 2008 || Kitt Peak || Spacewatch || — || align=right | 1.1 km || 
|-id=267 bgcolor=#d6d6d6
| 192267 ||  || — || May 29, 2008 || Mount Lemmon || Mount Lemmon Survey || EOS || align=right | 2.5 km || 
|-id=268 bgcolor=#C2FFFF
| 192268 ||  || — || June 7, 2008 || Kitt Peak || Spacewatch || L5 || align=right | 10 km || 
|-id=269 bgcolor=#E9E9E9
| 192269 ||  || — || July 26, 2008 || Siding Spring || SSS || — || align=right | 4.1 km || 
|-id=270 bgcolor=#E9E9E9
| 192270 || 7642 P-L || — || October 17, 1960 || Palomar || PLS || — || align=right | 3.2 km || 
|-id=271 bgcolor=#fefefe
| 192271 || 3310 T-1 || — || March 26, 1971 || Palomar || PLS || — || align=right | 2.8 km || 
|-id=272 bgcolor=#E9E9E9
| 192272 || 1132 T-2 || — || September 29, 1973 || Palomar || PLS || — || align=right | 2.4 km || 
|-id=273 bgcolor=#fefefe
| 192273 || 2299 T-2 || — || September 29, 1973 || Palomar || PLS || NYS || align=right | 1.1 km || 
|-id=274 bgcolor=#fefefe
| 192274 || 1169 T-3 || — || October 17, 1977 || Palomar || PLS || — || align=right data-sort-value="0.99" | 990 m || 
|-id=275 bgcolor=#d6d6d6
| 192275 || 2227 T-3 || — || October 16, 1977 || Palomar || PLS || — || align=right | 5.0 km || 
|-id=276 bgcolor=#E9E9E9
| 192276 || 2498 T-3 || — || October 16, 1977 || Palomar || PLS || — || align=right | 3.8 km || 
|-id=277 bgcolor=#E9E9E9
| 192277 || 3126 T-3 || — || October 16, 1977 || Palomar || PLS || MRX || align=right | 1.9 km || 
|-id=278 bgcolor=#fefefe
| 192278 || 3148 T-3 || — || October 16, 1977 || Palomar || PLS || — || align=right | 1.4 km || 
|-id=279 bgcolor=#fefefe
| 192279 || 3153 T-3 || — || October 16, 1977 || Palomar || PLS || — || align=right | 1.0 km || 
|-id=280 bgcolor=#fefefe
| 192280 || 3534 T-3 || — || October 16, 1977 || Palomar || PLS || — || align=right | 1.2 km || 
|-id=281 bgcolor=#E9E9E9
| 192281 ||  || — || October 27, 1978 || Palomar || C. M. Olmstead || — || align=right | 4.4 km || 
|-id=282 bgcolor=#fefefe
| 192282 ||  || — || June 25, 1979 || Siding Spring || E. F. Helin, S. J. Bus || — || align=right | 1.2 km || 
|-id=283 bgcolor=#E9E9E9
| 192283 ||  || — || March 2, 1981 || Siding Spring || S. J. Bus || — || align=right | 4.0 km || 
|-id=284 bgcolor=#fefefe
| 192284 ||  || — || March 7, 1981 || Siding Spring || S. J. Bus || — || align=right | 1.3 km || 
|-id=285 bgcolor=#E9E9E9
| 192285 ||  || — || March 1, 1981 || Siding Spring || S. J. Bus || — || align=right | 2.8 km || 
|-id=286 bgcolor=#E9E9E9
| 192286 ||  || — || March 1, 1981 || Siding Spring || S. J. Bus || — || align=right | 2.8 km || 
|-id=287 bgcolor=#fefefe
| 192287 ||  || — || March 2, 1981 || Siding Spring || S. J. Bus || ERI || align=right | 2.4 km || 
|-id=288 bgcolor=#E9E9E9
| 192288 ||  || — || March 1, 1981 || Siding Spring || S. J. Bus || — || align=right | 3.4 km || 
|-id=289 bgcolor=#fefefe
| 192289 ||  || — || March 1, 1981 || Siding Spring || S. J. Bus || — || align=right | 1.3 km || 
|-id=290 bgcolor=#E9E9E9
| 192290 || 1989 QT || — || August 26, 1989 || Siding Spring || R. H. McNaught || WAT || align=right | 3.9 km || 
|-id=291 bgcolor=#E9E9E9
| 192291 Palindrome ||  ||  || August 17, 1990 || Palomar || A. Lowe || — || align=right | 3.9 km || 
|-id=292 bgcolor=#fefefe
| 192292 ||  || — || September 13, 1990 || La Silla || H. Debehogne || NYS || align=right | 1.2 km || 
|-id=293 bgcolor=#E9E9E9
| 192293 Dominikbrunner ||  ||  || October 10, 1990 || Tautenburg Observatory || F. Börngen, L. D. Schmadel || MRX || align=right | 1.7 km || 
|-id=294 bgcolor=#fefefe
| 192294 ||  || — || October 6, 1991 || Palomar || A. Lowe || — || align=right | 1.0 km || 
|-id=295 bgcolor=#fefefe
| 192295 ||  || — || October 6, 1991 || Palomar || A. Lowe || — || align=right data-sort-value="0.94" | 940 m || 
|-id=296 bgcolor=#fefefe
| 192296 ||  || — || October 6, 1991 || Palomar || A. Lowe || NYS || align=right data-sort-value="0.82" | 820 m || 
|-id=297 bgcolor=#fefefe
| 192297 ||  || — || February 29, 1992 || La Silla || UESAC || — || align=right | 1.4 km || 
|-id=298 bgcolor=#fefefe
| 192298 ||  || — || March 6, 1992 || Kitt Peak || Spacewatch || — || align=right | 1.3 km || 
|-id=299 bgcolor=#E9E9E9
| 192299 ||  || — || March 1, 1992 || La Silla || UESAC || — || align=right | 1.8 km || 
|-id=300 bgcolor=#fefefe
| 192300 ||  || — || September 27, 1992 || Kitt Peak || Spacewatch || — || align=right | 1.0 km || 
|}

192301–192400 

|-bgcolor=#fefefe
| 192301 ||  || — || September 27, 1992 || Kitt Peak || Spacewatch || — || align=right data-sort-value="0.64" | 640 m || 
|-id=302 bgcolor=#fefefe
| 192302 ||  || — || January 21, 1993 || Kitt Peak || Spacewatch || FLO || align=right data-sort-value="0.88" | 880 m || 
|-id=303 bgcolor=#fefefe
| 192303 ||  || — || March 17, 1993 || La Silla || UESAC || — || align=right | 1.2 km || 
|-id=304 bgcolor=#E9E9E9
| 192304 ||  || — || March 19, 1993 || La Silla || UESAC || — || align=right | 4.4 km || 
|-id=305 bgcolor=#E9E9E9
| 192305 ||  || — || March 19, 1993 || La Silla || UESAC || — || align=right | 2.1 km || 
|-id=306 bgcolor=#E9E9E9
| 192306 ||  || — || March 17, 1993 || La Silla || UESAC || — || align=right | 2.5 km || 
|-id=307 bgcolor=#d6d6d6
| 192307 ||  || — || September 15, 1993 || La Silla || H. Debehogne, E. W. Elst || — || align=right | 3.3 km || 
|-id=308 bgcolor=#fefefe
| 192308 ||  || — || October 9, 1993 || Kitt Peak || Spacewatch || — || align=right | 1.2 km || 
|-id=309 bgcolor=#d6d6d6
| 192309 ||  || — || October 9, 1993 || La Silla || E. W. Elst || slow || align=right | 3.9 km || 
|-id=310 bgcolor=#fefefe
| 192310 ||  || — || October 9, 1993 || La Silla || E. W. Elst || — || align=right | 1.8 km || 
|-id=311 bgcolor=#fefefe
| 192311 ||  || — || October 9, 1993 || La Silla || E. W. Elst || MAS || align=right | 1.0 km || 
|-id=312 bgcolor=#fefefe
| 192312 ||  || — || January 8, 1994 || Kitt Peak || Spacewatch || MAS || align=right | 1.1 km || 
|-id=313 bgcolor=#fefefe
| 192313 ||  || — || January 12, 1994 || Kitt Peak || Spacewatch || NYS || align=right | 1.2 km || 
|-id=314 bgcolor=#fefefe
| 192314 ||  || — || February 9, 1994 || Farra d'Isonzo || Farra d'Isonzo || — || align=right | 1.2 km || 
|-id=315 bgcolor=#E9E9E9
| 192315 ||  || — || May 3, 1994 || Kitt Peak || Spacewatch || — || align=right | 1.3 km || 
|-id=316 bgcolor=#E9E9E9
| 192316 ||  || — || May 4, 1994 || Kitt Peak || Spacewatch || — || align=right | 2.5 km || 
|-id=317 bgcolor=#fefefe
| 192317 ||  || — || August 12, 1994 || La Silla || E. W. Elst || FLO || align=right | 1.0 km || 
|-id=318 bgcolor=#E9E9E9
| 192318 ||  || — || September 3, 1994 || La Silla || E. W. Elst || — || align=right | 5.2 km || 
|-id=319 bgcolor=#E9E9E9
| 192319 ||  || — || September 5, 1994 || La Silla || E. W. Elst || — || align=right | 3.7 km || 
|-id=320 bgcolor=#E9E9E9
| 192320 ||  || — || September 5, 1994 || La Silla || E. W. Elst || — || align=right | 4.2 km || 
|-id=321 bgcolor=#E9E9E9
| 192321 ||  || — || September 29, 1994 || Kitt Peak || Spacewatch || AST || align=right | 3.1 km || 
|-id=322 bgcolor=#E9E9E9
| 192322 ||  || — || September 29, 1994 || Kitt Peak || Spacewatch || NEM || align=right | 2.4 km || 
|-id=323 bgcolor=#fefefe
| 192323 ||  || — || September 29, 1994 || Kitt Peak || Spacewatch || — || align=right data-sort-value="0.87" | 870 m || 
|-id=324 bgcolor=#fefefe
| 192324 ||  || — || October 4, 1994 || Kitt Peak || Spacewatch || — || align=right data-sort-value="0.99" | 990 m || 
|-id=325 bgcolor=#fefefe
| 192325 ||  || — || October 28, 1994 || Kitt Peak || Spacewatch || — || align=right | 1.2 km || 
|-id=326 bgcolor=#E9E9E9
| 192326 ||  || — || October 28, 1994 || Kitt Peak || Spacewatch || AGN || align=right | 2.1 km || 
|-id=327 bgcolor=#E9E9E9
| 192327 ||  || — || November 1, 1994 || Kitt Peak || Spacewatch || — || align=right | 3.3 km || 
|-id=328 bgcolor=#E9E9E9
| 192328 ||  || — || November 28, 1994 || Kitt Peak || Spacewatch || — || align=right | 2.8 km || 
|-id=329 bgcolor=#fefefe
| 192329 ||  || — || January 31, 1995 || Kitt Peak || Spacewatch || NYS || align=right data-sort-value="0.84" | 840 m || 
|-id=330 bgcolor=#fefefe
| 192330 ||  || — || January 31, 1995 || Kitt Peak || Spacewatch || NYS || align=right data-sort-value="0.98" | 980 m || 
|-id=331 bgcolor=#fefefe
| 192331 ||  || — || February 1, 1995 || Kitt Peak || Spacewatch || — || align=right data-sort-value="0.82" | 820 m || 
|-id=332 bgcolor=#fefefe
| 192332 || 1995 FA || — || March 21, 1995 || Stroncone || Santa Lucia Obs. || — || align=right | 1.3 km || 
|-id=333 bgcolor=#fefefe
| 192333 ||  || — || March 23, 1995 || Kitt Peak || Spacewatch || — || align=right | 1.7 km || 
|-id=334 bgcolor=#d6d6d6
| 192334 ||  || — || April 6, 1995 || Kitt Peak || Spacewatch || HYG || align=right | 3.2 km || 
|-id=335 bgcolor=#fefefe
| 192335 ||  || — || April 26, 1995 || Kitt Peak || Spacewatch || NYS || align=right | 1.4 km || 
|-id=336 bgcolor=#d6d6d6
| 192336 ||  || — || May 25, 1995 || Kitt Peak || Spacewatch || — || align=right | 5.8 km || 
|-id=337 bgcolor=#E9E9E9
| 192337 ||  || — || June 23, 1995 || Kitt Peak || Spacewatch || — || align=right | 1.8 km || 
|-id=338 bgcolor=#d6d6d6
| 192338 ||  || — || June 23, 1995 || Kitt Peak || Spacewatch || EOS || align=right | 2.8 km || 
|-id=339 bgcolor=#E9E9E9
| 192339 ||  || — || July 22, 1995 || Kitt Peak || Spacewatch || — || align=right | 1.9 km || 
|-id=340 bgcolor=#E9E9E9
| 192340 ||  || — || July 23, 1995 || Kitt Peak || Spacewatch || — || align=right | 2.0 km || 
|-id=341 bgcolor=#E9E9E9
| 192341 ||  || — || August 22, 1995 || Kitt Peak || Spacewatch || — || align=right | 3.5 km || 
|-id=342 bgcolor=#E9E9E9
| 192342 ||  || — || September 18, 1995 || Kitt Peak || Spacewatch || — || align=right | 2.4 km || 
|-id=343 bgcolor=#C2FFFF
| 192343 ||  || — || September 18, 1995 || Kitt Peak || Spacewatch || L4 || align=right | 12 km || 
|-id=344 bgcolor=#E9E9E9
| 192344 ||  || — || September 18, 1995 || Kitt Peak || Spacewatch || — || align=right | 2.2 km || 
|-id=345 bgcolor=#C2FFFF
| 192345 ||  || — || September 19, 1995 || Kitt Peak || Spacewatch || L4 || align=right | 12 km || 
|-id=346 bgcolor=#E9E9E9
| 192346 ||  || — || September 21, 1995 || Kitt Peak || Spacewatch || JUN || align=right | 1.0 km || 
|-id=347 bgcolor=#E9E9E9
| 192347 ||  || — || September 21, 1995 || Kitt Peak || Spacewatch || MAR || align=right | 1.9 km || 
|-id=348 bgcolor=#E9E9E9
| 192348 ||  || — || September 24, 1995 || Kitt Peak || Spacewatch || — || align=right | 1.5 km || 
|-id=349 bgcolor=#E9E9E9
| 192349 ||  || — || September 25, 1995 || Kitt Peak || Spacewatch || — || align=right | 2.8 km || 
|-id=350 bgcolor=#E9E9E9
| 192350 ||  || — || September 26, 1995 || Kitt Peak || Spacewatch || — || align=right | 3.6 km || 
|-id=351 bgcolor=#E9E9E9
| 192351 ||  || — || September 26, 1995 || Kitt Peak || Spacewatch || — || align=right | 2.0 km || 
|-id=352 bgcolor=#E9E9E9
| 192352 ||  || — || September 26, 1995 || Kitt Peak || Spacewatch || JUN || align=right | 1.9 km || 
|-id=353 bgcolor=#E9E9E9
| 192353 Wangdazhong ||  ||  || October 14, 1995 || Xinglong || SCAP || — || align=right | 2.9 km || 
|-id=354 bgcolor=#E9E9E9
| 192354 ||  || — || October 15, 1995 || Kitt Peak || Spacewatch || JUN || align=right | 1.6 km || 
|-id=355 bgcolor=#E9E9E9
| 192355 ||  || — || October 15, 1995 || Kitt Peak || Spacewatch || — || align=right | 3.7 km || 
|-id=356 bgcolor=#E9E9E9
| 192356 ||  || — || October 17, 1995 || Kitt Peak || Spacewatch || — || align=right | 1.7 km || 
|-id=357 bgcolor=#E9E9E9
| 192357 ||  || — || October 17, 1995 || Kitt Peak || Spacewatch || RAF || align=right | 3.4 km || 
|-id=358 bgcolor=#fefefe
| 192358 ||  || — || November 14, 1995 || Kitt Peak || Spacewatch || FLO || align=right data-sort-value="0.87" | 870 m || 
|-id=359 bgcolor=#E9E9E9
| 192359 ||  || — || November 14, 1995 || Kitt Peak || Spacewatch || — || align=right | 2.1 km || 
|-id=360 bgcolor=#E9E9E9
| 192360 ||  || — || November 15, 1995 || Kitt Peak || Spacewatch || — || align=right | 2.9 km || 
|-id=361 bgcolor=#E9E9E9
| 192361 ||  || — || November 15, 1995 || Kitt Peak || Spacewatch || — || align=right | 1.7 km || 
|-id=362 bgcolor=#E9E9E9
| 192362 ||  || — || November 15, 1995 || Kitt Peak || Spacewatch || NEM || align=right | 3.1 km || 
|-id=363 bgcolor=#E9E9E9
| 192363 ||  || — || November 16, 1995 || Kitt Peak || Spacewatch || — || align=right | 2.6 km || 
|-id=364 bgcolor=#fefefe
| 192364 ||  || — || November 17, 1995 || Kitt Peak || Spacewatch || — || align=right | 1.2 km || 
|-id=365 bgcolor=#E9E9E9
| 192365 ||  || — || November 18, 1995 || Kitt Peak || Spacewatch || — || align=right | 2.9 km || 
|-id=366 bgcolor=#E9E9E9
| 192366 ||  || — || December 14, 1995 || Kitt Peak || Spacewatch || — || align=right | 4.5 km || 
|-id=367 bgcolor=#E9E9E9
| 192367 ||  || — || December 16, 1995 || Kitt Peak || Spacewatch || ADE || align=right | 3.5 km || 
|-id=368 bgcolor=#fefefe
| 192368 ||  || — || January 12, 1996 || Kitt Peak || Spacewatch || FLO || align=right | 1.2 km || 
|-id=369 bgcolor=#E9E9E9
| 192369 ||  || — || January 12, 1996 || Kitt Peak || Spacewatch || XIZ || align=right | 2.2 km || 
|-id=370 bgcolor=#E9E9E9
| 192370 ||  || — || January 13, 1996 || Kitt Peak || Spacewatch || AGN || align=right | 1.7 km || 
|-id=371 bgcolor=#E9E9E9
| 192371 ||  || — || January 14, 1996 || Kitt Peak || Spacewatch || — || align=right | 3.4 km || 
|-id=372 bgcolor=#E9E9E9
| 192372 ||  || — || January 15, 1996 || Kitt Peak || Spacewatch || — || align=right | 3.3 km || 
|-id=373 bgcolor=#E9E9E9
| 192373 ||  || — || January 18, 1996 || Kitt Peak || Spacewatch || — || align=right | 3.0 km || 
|-id=374 bgcolor=#E9E9E9
| 192374 ||  || — || January 19, 1996 || Kitt Peak || Spacewatch || — || align=right | 3.9 km || 
|-id=375 bgcolor=#d6d6d6
| 192375 ||  || — || January 19, 1996 || Kitt Peak || Spacewatch || KOR || align=right | 1.6 km || 
|-id=376 bgcolor=#d6d6d6
| 192376 ||  || — || March 11, 1996 || Kitt Peak || Spacewatch || — || align=right | 3.1 km || 
|-id=377 bgcolor=#E9E9E9
| 192377 ||  || — || March 12, 1996 || Kitt Peak || Spacewatch || AGN || align=right | 1.7 km || 
|-id=378 bgcolor=#fefefe
| 192378 ||  || — || March 20, 1996 || Kitt Peak || Spacewatch || — || align=right | 3.0 km || 
|-id=379 bgcolor=#d6d6d6
| 192379 ||  || — || April 12, 1996 || Kitt Peak || Spacewatch || CHA || align=right | 2.9 km || 
|-id=380 bgcolor=#d6d6d6
| 192380 ||  || — || April 14, 1996 || Kitt Peak || Spacewatch || NAE || align=right | 5.3 km || 
|-id=381 bgcolor=#fefefe
| 192381 ||  || — || April 18, 1996 || Kitt Peak || Spacewatch || V || align=right data-sort-value="0.99" | 990 m || 
|-id=382 bgcolor=#fefefe
| 192382 ||  || — || May 12, 1996 || Kitt Peak || Spacewatch || NYS || align=right data-sort-value="0.83" | 830 m || 
|-id=383 bgcolor=#fefefe
| 192383 ||  || — || May 13, 1996 || Kitt Peak || Spacewatch || — || align=right | 1.1 km || 
|-id=384 bgcolor=#fefefe
| 192384 ||  || — || May 18, 1996 || Kitt Peak || Spacewatch || V || align=right | 1.00 km || 
|-id=385 bgcolor=#fefefe
| 192385 ||  || — || September 8, 1996 || Kitt Peak || Spacewatch || — || align=right | 1.5 km || 
|-id=386 bgcolor=#C2FFFF
| 192386 ||  || — || September 8, 1996 || Kitt Peak || Spacewatch || L4 || align=right | 11 km || 
|-id=387 bgcolor=#d6d6d6
| 192387 ||  || — || September 13, 1996 || Kitt Peak || Spacewatch || THM || align=right | 3.0 km || 
|-id=388 bgcolor=#C2FFFF
| 192388 ||  || — || September 11, 1996 || La Silla || UDTS || L4ERY || align=right | 14 km || 
|-id=389 bgcolor=#C2FFFF
| 192389 ||  || — || September 12, 1996 || La Silla || UDTS || L4 || align=right | 16 km || 
|-id=390 bgcolor=#C2FFFF
| 192390 ||  || — || September 13, 1996 || La Silla || UDTS || L4 || align=right | 14 km || 
|-id=391 bgcolor=#d6d6d6
| 192391 ||  || — || October 3, 1996 || Xinglong || SCAP || — || align=right | 3.9 km || 
|-id=392 bgcolor=#E9E9E9
| 192392 ||  || — || October 4, 1996 || Kitt Peak || Spacewatch || — || align=right | 2.0 km || 
|-id=393 bgcolor=#C2FFFF
| 192393 ||  || — || October 6, 1996 || Kitt Peak || Spacewatch || L4 || align=right | 11 km || 
|-id=394 bgcolor=#fefefe
| 192394 ||  || — || October 11, 1996 || Kitt Peak || Spacewatch || V || align=right | 1.1 km || 
|-id=395 bgcolor=#fefefe
| 192395 ||  || — || October 12, 1996 || Kitt Peak || Spacewatch || — || align=right | 1.3 km || 
|-id=396 bgcolor=#E9E9E9
| 192396 ||  || — || December 1, 1996 || Kitt Peak || Spacewatch || — || align=right | 1.6 km || 
|-id=397 bgcolor=#E9E9E9
| 192397 ||  || — || December 7, 1996 || Oizumi || T. Kobayashi || — || align=right | 1.9 km || 
|-id=398 bgcolor=#E9E9E9
| 192398 ||  || — || December 2, 1996 || Kitt Peak || Spacewatch || — || align=right | 1.2 km || 
|-id=399 bgcolor=#E9E9E9
| 192399 ||  || — || December 13, 1996 || Kitt Peak || Spacewatch || — || align=right | 1.6 km || 
|-id=400 bgcolor=#E9E9E9
| 192400 ||  || — || January 3, 1997 || Oizumi || T. Kobayashi || — || align=right | 2.8 km || 
|}

192401–192500 

|-bgcolor=#E9E9E9
| 192401 ||  || — || January 2, 1997 || Kitt Peak || Spacewatch || ADE || align=right | 4.8 km || 
|-id=402 bgcolor=#E9E9E9
| 192402 ||  || — || January 10, 1997 || Oizumi || T. Kobayashi || — || align=right | 2.2 km || 
|-id=403 bgcolor=#E9E9E9
| 192403 ||  || — || January 31, 1997 || Kitt Peak || Spacewatch || — || align=right | 3.1 km || 
|-id=404 bgcolor=#E9E9E9
| 192404 ||  || — || March 3, 1997 || Kitt Peak || Spacewatch || — || align=right | 1.8 km || 
|-id=405 bgcolor=#E9E9E9
| 192405 ||  || — || March 4, 1997 || Kitt Peak || Spacewatch || — || align=right | 1.9 km || 
|-id=406 bgcolor=#E9E9E9
| 192406 ||  || — || March 4, 1997 || Kitt Peak || Spacewatch || WIT || align=right | 1.2 km || 
|-id=407 bgcolor=#E9E9E9
| 192407 ||  || — || March 5, 1997 || Kitt Peak || Spacewatch || HEN || align=right | 1.5 km || 
|-id=408 bgcolor=#E9E9E9
| 192408 ||  || — || April 2, 1997 || Kitt Peak || Spacewatch || — || align=right | 2.9 km || 
|-id=409 bgcolor=#E9E9E9
| 192409 ||  || — || April 3, 1997 || Socorro || LINEAR || — || align=right | 2.1 km || 
|-id=410 bgcolor=#E9E9E9
| 192410 ||  || — || April 7, 1997 || Kitt Peak || Spacewatch || — || align=right | 3.0 km || 
|-id=411 bgcolor=#fefefe
| 192411 ||  || — || April 15, 1997 || Kitt Peak || Spacewatch || — || align=right | 1.4 km || 
|-id=412 bgcolor=#fefefe
| 192412 ||  || — || April 30, 1997 || Socorro || LINEAR || — || align=right data-sort-value="0.97" | 970 m || 
|-id=413 bgcolor=#E9E9E9
| 192413 ||  || — || April 30, 1997 || Socorro || LINEAR || — || align=right | 2.7 km || 
|-id=414 bgcolor=#fefefe
| 192414 ||  || — || June 8, 1997 || La Silla || E. W. Elst || — || align=right data-sort-value="0.92" | 920 m || 
|-id=415 bgcolor=#fefefe
| 192415 ||  || — || June 8, 1997 || Kitt Peak || Spacewatch || — || align=right | 1.1 km || 
|-id=416 bgcolor=#fefefe
| 192416 ||  || — || June 28, 1997 || Rand || G. R. Viscome || H || align=right | 1.1 km || 
|-id=417 bgcolor=#d6d6d6
| 192417 ||  || — || July 7, 1997 || Kitt Peak || Spacewatch || — || align=right | 3.2 km || 
|-id=418 bgcolor=#d6d6d6
| 192418 ||  || — || August 10, 1997 || Ondřejov || P. Pravec || — || align=right | 4.6 km || 
|-id=419 bgcolor=#fefefe
| 192419 ||  || — || September 28, 1997 || Kitt Peak || Spacewatch || — || align=right | 3.9 km || 
|-id=420 bgcolor=#fefefe
| 192420 ||  || — || September 28, 1997 || Kitt Peak || Spacewatch || — || align=right | 1.6 km || 
|-id=421 bgcolor=#d6d6d6
| 192421 ||  || — || September 28, 1997 || Kitt Peak || Spacewatch || — || align=right | 4.3 km || 
|-id=422 bgcolor=#fefefe
| 192422 ||  || — || September 29, 1997 || Kitt Peak || Spacewatch || MAS || align=right data-sort-value="0.86" | 860 m || 
|-id=423 bgcolor=#C2FFFF
| 192423 ||  || — || September 28, 1997 || Kitt Peak || Spacewatch || L4 || align=right | 11 km || 
|-id=424 bgcolor=#fefefe
| 192424 ||  || — || September 30, 1997 || Kitt Peak || Spacewatch || — || align=right | 1.3 km || 
|-id=425 bgcolor=#d6d6d6
| 192425 ||  || — || September 29, 1997 || Kitt Peak || Spacewatch || — || align=right | 3.8 km || 
|-id=426 bgcolor=#d6d6d6
| 192426 ||  || — || October 3, 1997 || Caussols || ODAS || HYG || align=right | 4.0 km || 
|-id=427 bgcolor=#fefefe
| 192427 ||  || — || October 3, 1997 || Caussols || ODAS || MAS || align=right data-sort-value="0.92" | 920 m || 
|-id=428 bgcolor=#d6d6d6
| 192428 ||  || — || October 2, 1997 || Caussols || ODAS || HYG || align=right | 4.6 km || 
|-id=429 bgcolor=#fefefe
| 192429 ||  || — || October 2, 1997 || Kitt Peak || Spacewatch || V || align=right data-sort-value="0.84" | 840 m || 
|-id=430 bgcolor=#fefefe
| 192430 ||  || — || October 3, 1997 || Kitt Peak || Spacewatch || NYS || align=right data-sort-value="0.69" | 690 m || 
|-id=431 bgcolor=#fefefe
| 192431 ||  || — || October 4, 1997 || Kitt Peak || Spacewatch || — || align=right data-sort-value="0.86" | 860 m || 
|-id=432 bgcolor=#fefefe
| 192432 ||  || — || October 11, 1997 || Kitt Peak || Spacewatch || NYS || align=right data-sort-value="0.79" | 790 m || 
|-id=433 bgcolor=#fefefe
| 192433 ||  || — || October 8, 1997 || Uenohara || N. Kawasato || V || align=right | 1.1 km || 
|-id=434 bgcolor=#d6d6d6
| 192434 ||  || — || October 23, 1997 || Kitt Peak || Spacewatch || — || align=right | 4.3 km || 
|-id=435 bgcolor=#fefefe
| 192435 ||  || — || October 24, 1997 || Kitt Peak || Spacewatch || V || align=right | 1.0 km || 
|-id=436 bgcolor=#fefefe
| 192436 ||  || — || October 23, 1997 || Kitt Peak || Spacewatch || NYS || align=right data-sort-value="0.97" | 970 m || 
|-id=437 bgcolor=#d6d6d6
| 192437 ||  || — || October 23, 1997 || Kitt Peak || Spacewatch || — || align=right | 3.1 km || 
|-id=438 bgcolor=#fefefe
| 192438 ||  || — || October 26, 1997 || Cima Ekar || Asiago Obs. || — || align=right | 1.2 km || 
|-id=439 bgcolor=#fefefe
| 192439 Cílek || 1997 VC ||  || November 1, 1997 || Kleť || J. Tichá, M. Tichý || NYS || align=right data-sort-value="0.98" | 980 m || 
|-id=440 bgcolor=#fefefe
| 192440 ||  || — || November 2, 1997 || Xinglong || SCAP || — || align=right | 1.5 km || 
|-id=441 bgcolor=#fefefe
| 192441 ||  || — || November 19, 1997 || Xinglong || SCAP || — || align=right | 1.8 km || 
|-id=442 bgcolor=#C2FFFF
| 192442 ||  || — || November 22, 1997 || Kitt Peak || Spacewatch || L4 || align=right | 15 km || 
|-id=443 bgcolor=#fefefe
| 192443 ||  || — || November 23, 1997 || Kitt Peak || Spacewatch || ERI || align=right | 2.8 km || 
|-id=444 bgcolor=#fefefe
| 192444 ||  || — || November 21, 1997 || Kitt Peak || Spacewatch || MAS || align=right data-sort-value="0.91" | 910 m || 
|-id=445 bgcolor=#d6d6d6
| 192445 ||  || — || November 22, 1997 || Kitt Peak || Spacewatch || THM || align=right | 3.4 km || 
|-id=446 bgcolor=#fefefe
| 192446 ||  || — || November 23, 1997 || Kitt Peak || Spacewatch || MAS || align=right data-sort-value="0.82" | 820 m || 
|-id=447 bgcolor=#fefefe
| 192447 ||  || — || November 23, 1997 || Kitt Peak || Spacewatch || MAS || align=right | 1.2 km || 
|-id=448 bgcolor=#C2FFFF
| 192448 ||  || — || November 23, 1997 || Kitt Peak || Spacewatch || L4 || align=right | 11 km || 
|-id=449 bgcolor=#fefefe
| 192449 ||  || — || November 25, 1997 || Kitt Peak || Spacewatch || NYS || align=right data-sort-value="0.92" | 920 m || 
|-id=450 bgcolor=#d6d6d6
| 192450 Xinjiangdaxue ||  ||  || November 23, 1997 || Xinglong || SCAP || ALA || align=right | 7.5 km || 
|-id=451 bgcolor=#fefefe
| 192451 ||  || — || November 29, 1997 || Socorro || LINEAR || NYS || align=right | 1.5 km || 
|-id=452 bgcolor=#d6d6d6
| 192452 ||  || — || December 21, 1997 || Chichibu || N. Satō || — || align=right | 5.4 km || 
|-id=453 bgcolor=#E9E9E9
| 192453 ||  || — || January 18, 1998 || Kitt Peak || Spacewatch || — || align=right | 1.2 km || 
|-id=454 bgcolor=#d6d6d6
| 192454 ||  || — || January 22, 1998 || Kitt Peak || Spacewatch || HYG || align=right | 3.7 km || 
|-id=455 bgcolor=#d6d6d6
| 192455 ||  || — || January 22, 1998 || Kitt Peak || Spacewatch || THM || align=right | 4.5 km || 
|-id=456 bgcolor=#E9E9E9
| 192456 ||  || — || January 26, 1998 || Kitt Peak || Spacewatch || — || align=right | 2.0 km || 
|-id=457 bgcolor=#E9E9E9
| 192457 ||  || — || January 31, 1998 || Oizumi || T. Kobayashi || — || align=right | 2.5 km || 
|-id=458 bgcolor=#d6d6d6
| 192458 ||  || — || February 19, 1998 || Kleť || Kleť Obs. || — || align=right | 5.2 km || 
|-id=459 bgcolor=#E9E9E9
| 192459 ||  || — || February 17, 1998 || Kitt Peak || Spacewatch || EUN || align=right | 2.3 km || 
|-id=460 bgcolor=#d6d6d6
| 192460 ||  || — || February 22, 1998 || Kitt Peak || Spacewatch || VER || align=right | 5.9 km || 
|-id=461 bgcolor=#fefefe
| 192461 ||  || — || February 24, 1998 || Kitt Peak || Spacewatch || NYS || align=right data-sort-value="0.73" | 730 m || 
|-id=462 bgcolor=#E9E9E9
| 192462 ||  || — || March 2, 1998 || Xinglong || SCAP || — || align=right | 1.6 km || 
|-id=463 bgcolor=#E9E9E9
| 192463 ||  || — || March 23, 1998 || Kitt Peak || Spacewatch || RAF || align=right | 1.3 km || 
|-id=464 bgcolor=#E9E9E9
| 192464 ||  || — || March 20, 1998 || Kitt Peak || Spacewatch || — || align=right | 1.8 km || 
|-id=465 bgcolor=#E9E9E9
| 192465 ||  || — || March 26, 1998 || Caussols || ODAS || — || align=right | 2.3 km || 
|-id=466 bgcolor=#E9E9E9
| 192466 ||  || — || March 30, 1998 || Kleť || Kleť Obs. || — || align=right | 1.5 km || 
|-id=467 bgcolor=#E9E9E9
| 192467 ||  || — || March 20, 1998 || Socorro || LINEAR || — || align=right | 2.8 km || 
|-id=468 bgcolor=#E9E9E9
| 192468 ||  || — || March 20, 1998 || Socorro || LINEAR || — || align=right | 2.5 km || 
|-id=469 bgcolor=#E9E9E9
| 192469 ||  || — || March 20, 1998 || Socorro || LINEAR || — || align=right | 2.2 km || 
|-id=470 bgcolor=#E9E9E9
| 192470 ||  || — || March 20, 1998 || Socorro || LINEAR || — || align=right | 2.6 km || 
|-id=471 bgcolor=#fefefe
| 192471 ||  || — || March 20, 1998 || Socorro || LINEAR || MAS || align=right | 1.3 km || 
|-id=472 bgcolor=#E9E9E9
| 192472 ||  || — || March 20, 1998 || Socorro || LINEAR || EUN || align=right | 2.1 km || 
|-id=473 bgcolor=#E9E9E9
| 192473 ||  || — || March 20, 1998 || Socorro || LINEAR || — || align=right | 3.0 km || 
|-id=474 bgcolor=#E9E9E9
| 192474 ||  || — || March 20, 1998 || Socorro || LINEAR || — || align=right | 2.5 km || 
|-id=475 bgcolor=#E9E9E9
| 192475 ||  || — || March 20, 1998 || Socorro || LINEAR || MIT || align=right | 3.2 km || 
|-id=476 bgcolor=#E9E9E9
| 192476 ||  || — || March 20, 1998 || Socorro || LINEAR || — || align=right | 1.7 km || 
|-id=477 bgcolor=#E9E9E9
| 192477 ||  || — || March 20, 1998 || Socorro || LINEAR || — || align=right | 1.5 km || 
|-id=478 bgcolor=#E9E9E9
| 192478 ||  || — || March 28, 1998 || Socorro || LINEAR || RAF || align=right | 1.3 km || 
|-id=479 bgcolor=#E9E9E9
| 192479 ||  || — || March 28, 1998 || Socorro || LINEAR || — || align=right | 1.4 km || 
|-id=480 bgcolor=#E9E9E9
| 192480 ||  || — || March 28, 1998 || Socorro || LINEAR || — || align=right | 3.5 km || 
|-id=481 bgcolor=#E9E9E9
| 192481 ||  || — || April 2, 1998 || Socorro || LINEAR || — || align=right | 3.5 km || 
|-id=482 bgcolor=#d6d6d6
| 192482 ||  || — || April 2, 1998 || Socorro || LINEAR || Tj (2.96) || align=right | 8.4 km || 
|-id=483 bgcolor=#E9E9E9
| 192483 ||  || — || April 20, 1998 || Kitt Peak || Spacewatch || — || align=right | 1.7 km || 
|-id=484 bgcolor=#E9E9E9
| 192484 ||  || — || April 19, 1998 || Kitt Peak || Spacewatch || — || align=right | 1.9 km || 
|-id=485 bgcolor=#E9E9E9
| 192485 ||  || — || April 22, 1998 || Kitt Peak || Spacewatch || — || align=right | 1.5 km || 
|-id=486 bgcolor=#FA8072
| 192486 ||  || — || April 23, 1998 || Socorro || LINEAR || — || align=right | 2.3 km || 
|-id=487 bgcolor=#E9E9E9
| 192487 ||  || — || April 18, 1998 || Kitt Peak || Spacewatch || — || align=right | 3.9 km || 
|-id=488 bgcolor=#E9E9E9
| 192488 ||  || — || April 20, 1998 || Socorro || LINEAR || — || align=right | 2.6 km || 
|-id=489 bgcolor=#E9E9E9
| 192489 ||  || — || April 20, 1998 || Socorro || LINEAR || — || align=right | 3.1 km || 
|-id=490 bgcolor=#E9E9E9
| 192490 ||  || — || April 28, 1998 || Kitt Peak || Spacewatch || — || align=right | 1.4 km || 
|-id=491 bgcolor=#E9E9E9
| 192491 ||  || — || April 22, 1998 || Kitt Peak || Spacewatch || — || align=right | 1.8 km || 
|-id=492 bgcolor=#E9E9E9
| 192492 ||  || — || April 20, 1998 || Socorro || LINEAR || — || align=right | 3.5 km || 
|-id=493 bgcolor=#E9E9E9
| 192493 ||  || — || April 24, 1998 || Kitt Peak || Spacewatch || — || align=right | 2.4 km || 
|-id=494 bgcolor=#E9E9E9
| 192494 ||  || — || April 21, 1998 || Socorro || LINEAR || EUN || align=right | 3.3 km || 
|-id=495 bgcolor=#E9E9E9
| 192495 ||  || — || April 21, 1998 || Socorro || LINEAR || — || align=right | 4.1 km || 
|-id=496 bgcolor=#E9E9E9
| 192496 ||  || — || April 21, 1998 || Socorro || LINEAR || — || align=right | 1.7 km || 
|-id=497 bgcolor=#FA8072
| 192497 ||  || — || April 21, 1998 || Socorro || LINEAR || — || align=right data-sort-value="0.94" | 940 m || 
|-id=498 bgcolor=#E9E9E9
| 192498 ||  || — || May 22, 1998 || Anderson Mesa || LONEOS || — || align=right | 4.6 km || 
|-id=499 bgcolor=#E9E9E9
| 192499 ||  || — || May 22, 1998 || Kitt Peak || Spacewatch || — || align=right | 1.8 km || 
|-id=500 bgcolor=#E9E9E9
| 192500 ||  || — || May 22, 1998 || Socorro || LINEAR || — || align=right | 2.2 km || 
|}

192501–192600 

|-bgcolor=#E9E9E9
| 192501 ||  || — || May 26, 1998 || Kitt Peak || Spacewatch || — || align=right | 4.0 km || 
|-id=502 bgcolor=#E9E9E9
| 192502 ||  || — || May 26, 1998 || Kitt Peak || Spacewatch || — || align=right | 3.3 km || 
|-id=503 bgcolor=#E9E9E9
| 192503 ||  || — || May 22, 1998 || Socorro || LINEAR || — || align=right | 3.1 km || 
|-id=504 bgcolor=#E9E9E9
| 192504 ||  || — || June 20, 1998 || Caussols || ODAS || GEF || align=right | 4.1 km || 
|-id=505 bgcolor=#E9E9E9
| 192505 ||  || — || June 20, 1998 || Kitt Peak || Spacewatch || — || align=right | 2.2 km || 
|-id=506 bgcolor=#E9E9E9
| 192506 ||  || — || June 25, 1998 || Kitt Peak || Spacewatch || — || align=right | 3.2 km || 
|-id=507 bgcolor=#FA8072
| 192507 ||  || — || June 24, 1998 || Anderson Mesa || LONEOS || — || align=right | 1.5 km || 
|-id=508 bgcolor=#fefefe
| 192508 ||  || — || July 26, 1998 || La Silla || E. W. Elst || FLO || align=right data-sort-value="0.88" | 880 m || 
|-id=509 bgcolor=#fefefe
| 192509 ||  || — || August 22, 1998 || Xinglong || SCAP || FLO || align=right data-sort-value="0.99" | 990 m || 
|-id=510 bgcolor=#d6d6d6
| 192510 ||  || — || August 25, 1998 || Xinglong || SCAP || BRA || align=right | 2.7 km || 
|-id=511 bgcolor=#d6d6d6
| 192511 ||  || — || August 24, 1998 || Socorro || LINEAR || — || align=right | 5.1 km || 
|-id=512 bgcolor=#d6d6d6
| 192512 ||  || — || August 24, 1998 || Socorro || LINEAR || BRA || align=right | 2.7 km || 
|-id=513 bgcolor=#fefefe
| 192513 ||  || — || August 26, 1998 || La Silla || E. W. Elst || — || align=right | 1.1 km || 
|-id=514 bgcolor=#d6d6d6
| 192514 ||  || — || September 14, 1998 || Kitt Peak || Spacewatch || — || align=right | 3.2 km || 
|-id=515 bgcolor=#fefefe
| 192515 ||  || — || September 1, 1998 || Xinglong || SCAP || — || align=right | 1.1 km || 
|-id=516 bgcolor=#fefefe
| 192516 ||  || — || September 10, 1998 || Caussols || ODAS || FLO || align=right data-sort-value="0.83" | 830 m || 
|-id=517 bgcolor=#d6d6d6
| 192517 ||  || — || September 14, 1998 || Socorro || LINEAR || BRA || align=right | 3.1 km || 
|-id=518 bgcolor=#E9E9E9
| 192518 ||  || — || September 14, 1998 || Socorro || LINEAR || — || align=right | 5.3 km || 
|-id=519 bgcolor=#fefefe
| 192519 ||  || — || September 14, 1998 || Socorro || LINEAR || — || align=right | 1.1 km || 
|-id=520 bgcolor=#fefefe
| 192520 ||  || — || September 14, 1998 || Socorro || LINEAR || — || align=right | 1.2 km || 
|-id=521 bgcolor=#fefefe
| 192521 ||  || — || September 14, 1998 || Socorro || LINEAR || — || align=right | 1.4 km || 
|-id=522 bgcolor=#fefefe
| 192522 ||  || — || September 14, 1998 || Socorro || LINEAR || — || align=right | 1.3 km || 
|-id=523 bgcolor=#fefefe
| 192523 ||  || — || September 13, 1998 || Kitt Peak || Spacewatch || — || align=right | 1.1 km || 
|-id=524 bgcolor=#fefefe
| 192524 ||  || — || September 15, 1998 || Anderson Mesa || LONEOS || — || align=right | 1.1 km || 
|-id=525 bgcolor=#fefefe
| 192525 ||  || — || September 21, 1998 || Višnjan Observatory || Višnjan Obs. || — || align=right | 2.9 km || 
|-id=526 bgcolor=#d6d6d6
| 192526 ||  || — || September 16, 1998 || Kitt Peak || Spacewatch || KOR || align=right | 1.8 km || 
|-id=527 bgcolor=#fefefe
| 192527 ||  || — || September 17, 1998 || Kitt Peak || Spacewatch || — || align=right | 1.0 km || 
|-id=528 bgcolor=#d6d6d6
| 192528 ||  || — || September 25, 1998 || Kitt Peak || Spacewatch || — || align=right | 4.1 km || 
|-id=529 bgcolor=#fefefe
| 192529 ||  || — || September 27, 1998 || Kitt Peak || Spacewatch || — || align=right | 1.1 km || 
|-id=530 bgcolor=#fefefe
| 192530 ||  || — || September 28, 1998 || Kitt Peak || Spacewatch || — || align=right data-sort-value="0.97" | 970 m || 
|-id=531 bgcolor=#fefefe
| 192531 ||  || — || September 18, 1998 || Anderson Mesa || LONEOS || — || align=right | 1.2 km || 
|-id=532 bgcolor=#fefefe
| 192532 ||  || — || September 20, 1998 || La Silla || E. W. Elst || — || align=right | 1.4 km || 
|-id=533 bgcolor=#fefefe
| 192533 ||  || — || September 21, 1998 || Socorro || LINEAR || — || align=right | 1.2 km || 
|-id=534 bgcolor=#fefefe
| 192534 ||  || — || September 26, 1998 || Socorro || LINEAR || FLO || align=right | 1.0 km || 
|-id=535 bgcolor=#fefefe
| 192535 ||  || — || September 26, 1998 || Socorro || LINEAR || — || align=right data-sort-value="0.90" | 900 m || 
|-id=536 bgcolor=#fefefe
| 192536 ||  || — || September 26, 1998 || Socorro || LINEAR || FLO || align=right data-sort-value="0.77" | 770 m || 
|-id=537 bgcolor=#fefefe
| 192537 ||  || — || September 26, 1998 || Socorro || LINEAR || — || align=right data-sort-value="0.94" | 940 m || 
|-id=538 bgcolor=#fefefe
| 192538 ||  || — || September 26, 1998 || Socorro || LINEAR || — || align=right data-sort-value="0.99" | 990 m || 
|-id=539 bgcolor=#fefefe
| 192539 ||  || — || September 26, 1998 || Socorro || LINEAR || — || align=right | 1.4 km || 
|-id=540 bgcolor=#fefefe
| 192540 ||  || — || September 26, 1998 || Socorro || LINEAR || FLO || align=right data-sort-value="0.85" | 850 m || 
|-id=541 bgcolor=#fefefe
| 192541 ||  || — || September 26, 1998 || Socorro || LINEAR || FLO || align=right | 1.00 km || 
|-id=542 bgcolor=#fefefe
| 192542 ||  || — || September 20, 1998 || La Silla || E. W. Elst || — || align=right data-sort-value="0.98" | 980 m || 
|-id=543 bgcolor=#d6d6d6
| 192543 ||  || — || September 20, 1998 || La Silla || E. W. Elst || EOS || align=right | 4.3 km || 
|-id=544 bgcolor=#fefefe
| 192544 ||  || — || September 26, 1998 || Socorro || LINEAR || — || align=right data-sort-value="0.97" | 970 m || 
|-id=545 bgcolor=#fefefe
| 192545 ||  || — || September 26, 1998 || Socorro || LINEAR || — || align=right | 1.3 km || 
|-id=546 bgcolor=#fefefe
| 192546 ||  || — || October 12, 1998 || Kitt Peak || Spacewatch || FLO || align=right data-sort-value="0.85" | 850 m || 
|-id=547 bgcolor=#FA8072
| 192547 ||  || — || October 1, 1998 || Kitt Peak || Spacewatch || — || align=right data-sort-value="0.75" | 750 m || 
|-id=548 bgcolor=#E9E9E9
| 192548 ||  || — || October 14, 1998 || Caussols || ODAS || — || align=right | 2.7 km || 
|-id=549 bgcolor=#d6d6d6
| 192549 ||  || — || October 14, 1998 || Kitt Peak || Spacewatch || — || align=right | 2.7 km || 
|-id=550 bgcolor=#d6d6d6
| 192550 ||  || — || October 13, 1998 || Kitt Peak || Spacewatch || — || align=right | 2.4 km || 
|-id=551 bgcolor=#d6d6d6
| 192551 ||  || — || October 14, 1998 || Kitt Peak || Spacewatch || — || align=right | 3.1 km || 
|-id=552 bgcolor=#d6d6d6
| 192552 ||  || — || October 14, 1998 || Kitt Peak || Spacewatch || — || align=right | 4.8 km || 
|-id=553 bgcolor=#fefefe
| 192553 ||  || — || October 15, 1998 || Kitt Peak || Spacewatch || — || align=right data-sort-value="0.78" | 780 m || 
|-id=554 bgcolor=#d6d6d6
| 192554 ||  || — || October 15, 1998 || Kitt Peak || Spacewatch || KAR || align=right | 1.6 km || 
|-id=555 bgcolor=#d6d6d6
| 192555 ||  || — || October 15, 1998 || Kitt Peak || Spacewatch || BRA || align=right | 2.1 km || 
|-id=556 bgcolor=#d6d6d6
| 192556 ||  || — || October 22, 1998 || Caussols || ODAS || — || align=right | 3.8 km || 
|-id=557 bgcolor=#fefefe
| 192557 ||  || — || October 18, 1998 || Kitt Peak || Spacewatch || — || align=right data-sort-value="0.96" | 960 m || 
|-id=558 bgcolor=#d6d6d6
| 192558 ||  || — || October 17, 1998 || Xinglong || SCAP || EOS || align=right | 3.2 km || 
|-id=559 bgcolor=#FFC2E0
| 192559 || 1998 VO || — || November 10, 1998 || Socorro || LINEAR || APOPHA || align=right data-sort-value="0.31" | 310 m || 
|-id=560 bgcolor=#fefefe
| 192560 || 1998 VT || — || November 11, 1998 || Anderson Mesa || LONEOS || H || align=right | 1.3 km || 
|-id=561 bgcolor=#fefefe
| 192561 ||  || — || November 10, 1998 || Socorro || LINEAR || — || align=right data-sort-value="0.97" | 970 m || 
|-id=562 bgcolor=#fefefe
| 192562 ||  || — || November 10, 1998 || Socorro || LINEAR || — || align=right | 1.3 km || 
|-id=563 bgcolor=#FFC2E0
| 192563 ||  || — || November 23, 1998 || Oizumi || T. Kobayashi || APO +1kmPHA || align=right | 1.3 km || 
|-id=564 bgcolor=#fefefe
| 192564 ||  || — || November 18, 1998 || Socorro || LINEAR || — || align=right | 1.0 km || 
|-id=565 bgcolor=#fefefe
| 192565 ||  || — || November 17, 1998 || Kitt Peak || Spacewatch || NYS || align=right data-sort-value="0.72" | 720 m || 
|-id=566 bgcolor=#d6d6d6
| 192566 ||  || — || November 18, 1998 || Kitt Peak || Spacewatch || KOR || align=right | 1.9 km || 
|-id=567 bgcolor=#d6d6d6
| 192567 ||  || — || November 18, 1998 || Kitt Peak || Spacewatch || KOR || align=right | 1.8 km || 
|-id=568 bgcolor=#fefefe
| 192568 ||  || — || November 19, 1998 || Kitt Peak || Spacewatch || — || align=right | 1.3 km || 
|-id=569 bgcolor=#d6d6d6
| 192569 ||  || — || November 19, 1998 || Kitt Peak || Spacewatch || — || align=right | 4.7 km || 
|-id=570 bgcolor=#fefefe
| 192570 ||  || — || November 19, 1998 || Kitt Peak || Spacewatch || V || align=right | 1.1 km || 
|-id=571 bgcolor=#d6d6d6
| 192571 ||  || — || November 21, 1998 || Kitt Peak || Spacewatch || — || align=right | 5.0 km || 
|-id=572 bgcolor=#d6d6d6
| 192572 ||  || — || November 23, 1998 || Kitt Peak || Spacewatch || — || align=right | 6.2 km || 
|-id=573 bgcolor=#fefefe
| 192573 || 1998 XL || — || December 6, 1998 || San Marcello || L. Tesi, A. Boattini || — || align=right | 1.8 km || 
|-id=574 bgcolor=#d6d6d6
| 192574 ||  || — || December 8, 1998 || Kitt Peak || Spacewatch || — || align=right | 4.9 km || 
|-id=575 bgcolor=#d6d6d6
| 192575 ||  || — || December 10, 1998 || Kitt Peak || Spacewatch || HYG || align=right | 5.3 km || 
|-id=576 bgcolor=#d6d6d6
| 192576 ||  || — || December 10, 1998 || Kitt Peak || Spacewatch || — || align=right | 3.2 km || 
|-id=577 bgcolor=#d6d6d6
| 192577 ||  || — || December 14, 1998 || Kitt Peak || Spacewatch || — || align=right | 2.9 km || 
|-id=578 bgcolor=#fefefe
| 192578 ||  || — || December 15, 1998 || Kitt Peak || Spacewatch || — || align=right | 1.0 km || 
|-id=579 bgcolor=#d6d6d6
| 192579 ||  || — || December 11, 1998 || Socorro || LINEAR || EUP || align=right | 6.8 km || 
|-id=580 bgcolor=#d6d6d6
| 192580 ||  || — || December 10, 1998 || Kitt Peak || Spacewatch || ALA || align=right | 4.9 km || 
|-id=581 bgcolor=#d6d6d6
| 192581 ||  || — || December 22, 1998 || Kitt Peak || Spacewatch || HYG || align=right | 5.0 km || 
|-id=582 bgcolor=#d6d6d6
| 192582 ||  || — || December 25, 1998 || Kitt Peak || Spacewatch || — || align=right | 4.1 km || 
|-id=583 bgcolor=#fefefe
| 192583 ||  || — || January 13, 1999 || Xinglong || SCAP || H || align=right | 1.0 km || 
|-id=584 bgcolor=#fefefe
| 192584 ||  || — || January 8, 1999 || Kitt Peak || Spacewatch || — || align=right | 1.6 km || 
|-id=585 bgcolor=#d6d6d6
| 192585 ||  || — || January 15, 1999 || Catalina || CSS || EUP || align=right | 5.9 km || 
|-id=586 bgcolor=#fefefe
| 192586 ||  || — || January 13, 1999 || Kitt Peak || Spacewatch || — || align=right | 1.4 km || 
|-id=587 bgcolor=#d6d6d6
| 192587 ||  || — || January 14, 1999 || Kitt Peak || Spacewatch || — || align=right | 4.5 km || 
|-id=588 bgcolor=#fefefe
| 192588 ||  || — || January 18, 1999 || Kleť || Kleť Obs. || — || align=right | 1.2 km || 
|-id=589 bgcolor=#d6d6d6
| 192589 ||  || — || January 20, 1999 || Caussols || ODAS || THM || align=right | 5.0 km || 
|-id=590 bgcolor=#fefefe
| 192590 ||  || — || January 21, 1999 || Caussols || ODAS || — || align=right | 1.3 km || 
|-id=591 bgcolor=#d6d6d6
| 192591 ||  || — || February 13, 1999 || Eskridge || G. Hug, G. Bell || LIX || align=right | 5.9 km || 
|-id=592 bgcolor=#fefefe
| 192592 ||  || — || February 12, 1999 || Socorro || LINEAR || PHO || align=right | 1.4 km || 
|-id=593 bgcolor=#d6d6d6
| 192593 ||  || — || February 10, 1999 || Socorro || LINEAR || — || align=right | 6.0 km || 
|-id=594 bgcolor=#d6d6d6
| 192594 ||  || — || February 10, 1999 || Socorro || LINEAR || — || align=right | 5.1 km || 
|-id=595 bgcolor=#d6d6d6
| 192595 ||  || — || February 10, 1999 || Socorro || LINEAR || — || align=right | 7.4 km || 
|-id=596 bgcolor=#fefefe
| 192596 ||  || — || February 10, 1999 || Socorro || LINEAR || — || align=right | 1.3 km || 
|-id=597 bgcolor=#d6d6d6
| 192597 ||  || — || February 10, 1999 || Socorro || LINEAR || — || align=right | 3.4 km || 
|-id=598 bgcolor=#d6d6d6
| 192598 ||  || — || February 11, 1999 || Socorro || LINEAR || — || align=right | 7.7 km || 
|-id=599 bgcolor=#fefefe
| 192599 ||  || — || February 9, 1999 || Kitt Peak || Spacewatch || V || align=right data-sort-value="0.91" | 910 m || 
|-id=600 bgcolor=#fefefe
| 192600 ||  || — || February 9, 1999 || Kitt Peak || Spacewatch || MAS || align=right data-sort-value="0.96" | 960 m || 
|}

192601–192700 

|-bgcolor=#fefefe
| 192601 ||  || — || February 9, 1999 || Kitt Peak || Spacewatch || NYS || align=right | 1.4 km || 
|-id=602 bgcolor=#fefefe
| 192602 ||  || — || March 10, 1999 || Kitt Peak || Spacewatch || MAS || align=right data-sort-value="0.90" | 900 m || 
|-id=603 bgcolor=#fefefe
| 192603 ||  || — || March 15, 1999 || Kitt Peak || Spacewatch || FLO || align=right data-sort-value="0.82" | 820 m || 
|-id=604 bgcolor=#d6d6d6
| 192604 ||  || — || March 10, 1999 || Kitt Peak || Spacewatch || VER || align=right | 4.3 km || 
|-id=605 bgcolor=#d6d6d6
| 192605 ||  || — || March 18, 1999 || Kitt Peak || Spacewatch || LIX || align=right | 7.4 km || 
|-id=606 bgcolor=#d6d6d6
| 192606 ||  || — || March 20, 1999 || Socorro || LINEAR || — || align=right | 4.1 km || 
|-id=607 bgcolor=#fefefe
| 192607 ||  || — || March 19, 1999 || Kitt Peak || Spacewatch || — || align=right | 1.5 km || 
|-id=608 bgcolor=#fefefe
| 192608 ||  || — || March 19, 1999 || Caussols || ODAS || — || align=right | 1.4 km || 
|-id=609 bgcolor=#E9E9E9
| 192609 ||  || — || April 12, 1999 || Cocoa || I. P. Griffin || — || align=right | 2.7 km || 
|-id=610 bgcolor=#fefefe
| 192610 ||  || — || April 11, 1999 || Kitt Peak || Spacewatch || — || align=right | 1.4 km || 
|-id=611 bgcolor=#fefefe
| 192611 ||  || — || April 7, 1999 || Socorro || LINEAR || NYS || align=right | 1.4 km || 
|-id=612 bgcolor=#fefefe
| 192612 ||  || — || April 12, 1999 || Socorro || LINEAR || — || align=right | 1.6 km || 
|-id=613 bgcolor=#fefefe
| 192613 ||  || — || April 12, 1999 || Socorro || LINEAR || — || align=right | 1.7 km || 
|-id=614 bgcolor=#d6d6d6
| 192614 ||  || — || April 6, 1999 || Kitt Peak || Spacewatch || — || align=right | 3.4 km || 
|-id=615 bgcolor=#fefefe
| 192615 ||  || — || April 9, 1999 || Kitt Peak || Spacewatch || — || align=right data-sort-value="0.99" | 990 m || 
|-id=616 bgcolor=#fefefe
| 192616 ||  || — || April 7, 1999 || Socorro || LINEAR || — || align=right | 1.4 km || 
|-id=617 bgcolor=#fefefe
| 192617 ||  || — || April 17, 1999 || Socorro || LINEAR || — || align=right | 3.3 km || 
|-id=618 bgcolor=#fefefe
| 192618 ||  || — || May 10, 1999 || Socorro || LINEAR || H || align=right data-sort-value="0.95" | 950 m || 
|-id=619 bgcolor=#fefefe
| 192619 ||  || — || May 10, 1999 || Socorro || LINEAR || PHO || align=right | 2.0 km || 
|-id=620 bgcolor=#fefefe
| 192620 ||  || — || May 12, 1999 || Socorro || LINEAR || PHO || align=right | 3.7 km || 
|-id=621 bgcolor=#E9E9E9
| 192621 ||  || — || May 10, 1999 || Socorro || LINEAR || — || align=right | 3.1 km || 
|-id=622 bgcolor=#fefefe
| 192622 ||  || — || May 10, 1999 || Socorro || LINEAR || — || align=right | 3.5 km || 
|-id=623 bgcolor=#E9E9E9
| 192623 ||  || — || May 10, 1999 || Socorro || LINEAR || — || align=right | 1.6 km || 
|-id=624 bgcolor=#fefefe
| 192624 ||  || — || May 10, 1999 || Socorro || LINEAR || — || align=right | 1.6 km || 
|-id=625 bgcolor=#fefefe
| 192625 ||  || — || May 13, 1999 || Socorro || LINEAR || CHL || align=right | 3.1 km || 
|-id=626 bgcolor=#E9E9E9
| 192626 ||  || — || May 14, 1999 || Catalina || CSS || — || align=right | 2.1 km || 
|-id=627 bgcolor=#E9E9E9
| 192627 || 1999 KS || — || May 16, 1999 || Catalina || CSS || — || align=right | 1.4 km || 
|-id=628 bgcolor=#fefefe
| 192628 ||  || — || May 17, 1999 || Kitt Peak || Spacewatch || — || align=right | 1.2 km || 
|-id=629 bgcolor=#E9E9E9
| 192629 ||  || — || May 18, 1999 || Socorro || LINEAR || — || align=right | 1.6 km || 
|-id=630 bgcolor=#E9E9E9
| 192630 || 1999 LL || — || June 5, 1999 || Woomera || F. B. Zoltowski || — || align=right | 1.8 km || 
|-id=631 bgcolor=#E9E9E9
| 192631 ||  || — || June 9, 1999 || Kitt Peak || Spacewatch || — || align=right | 1.8 km || 
|-id=632 bgcolor=#E9E9E9
| 192632 ||  || — || July 12, 1999 || Socorro || LINEAR || — || align=right | 2.3 km || 
|-id=633 bgcolor=#E9E9E9
| 192633 ||  || — || July 12, 1999 || Socorro || LINEAR || EUN || align=right | 2.7 km || 
|-id=634 bgcolor=#E9E9E9
| 192634 ||  || — || July 13, 1999 || Socorro || LINEAR || — || align=right | 3.2 km || 
|-id=635 bgcolor=#E9E9E9
| 192635 || 1999 QT || — || August 17, 1999 || Kitt Peak || Spacewatch || WIT || align=right | 1.5 km || 
|-id=636 bgcolor=#E9E9E9
| 192636 ||  || — || August 31, 1999 || Ondřejov || L. Kotková || — || align=right | 4.0 km || 
|-id=637 bgcolor=#E9E9E9
| 192637 ||  || — || September 3, 1999 || Kitt Peak || Spacewatch || — || align=right | 2.7 km || 
|-id=638 bgcolor=#E9E9E9
| 192638 ||  || — || September 7, 1999 || Socorro || LINEAR || — || align=right | 3.5 km || 
|-id=639 bgcolor=#E9E9E9
| 192639 ||  || — || September 7, 1999 || Socorro || LINEAR || GAL || align=right | 2.4 km || 
|-id=640 bgcolor=#E9E9E9
| 192640 ||  || — || September 7, 1999 || Socorro || LINEAR || — || align=right | 4.0 km || 
|-id=641 bgcolor=#E9E9E9
| 192641 ||  || — || September 7, 1999 || Socorro || LINEAR || — || align=right | 2.8 km || 
|-id=642 bgcolor=#FFC2E0
| 192642 ||  || — || September 8, 1999 || Socorro || LINEAR || APO +1kmPHA || align=right | 2.0 km || 
|-id=643 bgcolor=#E9E9E9
| 192643 ||  || — || September 6, 1999 || Catalina || CSS || JUN || align=right | 1.9 km || 
|-id=644 bgcolor=#E9E9E9
| 192644 ||  || — || September 7, 1999 || Catalina || CSS || — || align=right | 4.6 km || 
|-id=645 bgcolor=#E9E9E9
| 192645 ||  || — || September 7, 1999 || Socorro || LINEAR || JUN || align=right | 1.6 km || 
|-id=646 bgcolor=#E9E9E9
| 192646 ||  || — || September 7, 1999 || Socorro || LINEAR || — || align=right | 2.6 km || 
|-id=647 bgcolor=#E9E9E9
| 192647 ||  || — || September 7, 1999 || Socorro || LINEAR || — || align=right | 2.7 km || 
|-id=648 bgcolor=#E9E9E9
| 192648 ||  || — || September 7, 1999 || Socorro || LINEAR || HEN || align=right | 1.7 km || 
|-id=649 bgcolor=#E9E9E9
| 192649 ||  || — || September 7, 1999 || Socorro || LINEAR || — || align=right | 3.4 km || 
|-id=650 bgcolor=#E9E9E9
| 192650 ||  || — || September 7, 1999 || Socorro || LINEAR || — || align=right | 3.7 km || 
|-id=651 bgcolor=#E9E9E9
| 192651 ||  || — || September 7, 1999 || Socorro || LINEAR || MIS || align=right | 4.5 km || 
|-id=652 bgcolor=#E9E9E9
| 192652 ||  || — || September 7, 1999 || Socorro || LINEAR || — || align=right | 3.1 km || 
|-id=653 bgcolor=#E9E9E9
| 192653 ||  || — || September 8, 1999 || Socorro || LINEAR || — || align=right | 3.0 km || 
|-id=654 bgcolor=#E9E9E9
| 192654 ||  || — || September 8, 1999 || Socorro || LINEAR || — || align=right | 3.6 km || 
|-id=655 bgcolor=#E9E9E9
| 192655 ||  || — || September 8, 1999 || Socorro || LINEAR || — || align=right | 3.8 km || 
|-id=656 bgcolor=#E9E9E9
| 192656 ||  || — || September 9, 1999 || Socorro || LINEAR || JUN || align=right | 1.6 km || 
|-id=657 bgcolor=#E9E9E9
| 192657 ||  || — || September 9, 1999 || Socorro || LINEAR || — || align=right | 2.9 km || 
|-id=658 bgcolor=#E9E9E9
| 192658 ||  || — || September 9, 1999 || Socorro || LINEAR || — || align=right | 3.9 km || 
|-id=659 bgcolor=#E9E9E9
| 192659 ||  || — || September 9, 1999 || Socorro || LINEAR || — || align=right | 3.9 km || 
|-id=660 bgcolor=#E9E9E9
| 192660 ||  || — || September 9, 1999 || Socorro || LINEAR || EUN || align=right | 2.3 km || 
|-id=661 bgcolor=#E9E9E9
| 192661 ||  || — || September 9, 1999 || Socorro || LINEAR || — || align=right | 2.7 km || 
|-id=662 bgcolor=#E9E9E9
| 192662 ||  || — || September 9, 1999 || Socorro || LINEAR || — || align=right | 2.8 km || 
|-id=663 bgcolor=#E9E9E9
| 192663 ||  || — || September 9, 1999 || Socorro || LINEAR || — || align=right | 3.7 km || 
|-id=664 bgcolor=#E9E9E9
| 192664 ||  || — || September 9, 1999 || Socorro || LINEAR || — || align=right | 3.3 km || 
|-id=665 bgcolor=#E9E9E9
| 192665 ||  || — || September 14, 1999 || Kitt Peak || Spacewatch || HEN || align=right | 1.6 km || 
|-id=666 bgcolor=#E9E9E9
| 192666 ||  || — || September 9, 1999 || Socorro || LINEAR || MIS || align=right | 3.1 km || 
|-id=667 bgcolor=#E9E9E9
| 192667 ||  || — || September 10, 1999 || Socorro || LINEAR || EUN || align=right | 2.3 km || 
|-id=668 bgcolor=#E9E9E9
| 192668 ||  || — || September 8, 1999 || Socorro || LINEAR || ADE || align=right | 4.5 km || 
|-id=669 bgcolor=#E9E9E9
| 192669 ||  || — || September 8, 1999 || Socorro || LINEAR || — || align=right | 4.6 km || 
|-id=670 bgcolor=#E9E9E9
| 192670 ||  || — || September 8, 1999 || Socorro || LINEAR || — || align=right | 2.8 km || 
|-id=671 bgcolor=#E9E9E9
| 192671 ||  || — || September 11, 1999 || Socorro || LINEAR || — || align=right | 2.5 km || 
|-id=672 bgcolor=#E9E9E9
| 192672 ||  || — || September 4, 1999 || Catalina || CSS || — || align=right | 2.8 km || 
|-id=673 bgcolor=#E9E9E9
| 192673 ||  || — || September 7, 1999 || Catalina || CSS || JUN || align=right | 2.2 km || 
|-id=674 bgcolor=#E9E9E9
| 192674 ||  || — || September 7, 1999 || Catalina || CSS || — || align=right | 2.9 km || 
|-id=675 bgcolor=#E9E9E9
| 192675 ||  || — || September 4, 1999 || Catalina || CSS || — || align=right | 4.2 km || 
|-id=676 bgcolor=#E9E9E9
| 192676 ||  || — || September 8, 1999 || Catalina || CSS || — || align=right | 2.9 km || 
|-id=677 bgcolor=#E9E9E9
| 192677 ||  || — || September 8, 1999 || Socorro || LINEAR || — || align=right | 2.4 km || 
|-id=678 bgcolor=#E9E9E9
| 192678 ||  || — || September 30, 1999 || Socorro || LINEAR || JUN || align=right | 1.9 km || 
|-id=679 bgcolor=#E9E9E9
| 192679 ||  || — || September 30, 1999 || Socorro || LINEAR || — || align=right | 2.9 km || 
|-id=680 bgcolor=#E9E9E9
| 192680 ||  || — || September 30, 1999 || Catalina || CSS || ADE || align=right | 4.8 km || 
|-id=681 bgcolor=#E9E9E9
| 192681 ||  || — || September 30, 1999 || Kitt Peak || Spacewatch || — || align=right | 2.9 km || 
|-id=682 bgcolor=#E9E9E9
| 192682 ||  || — || September 30, 1999 || Kitt Peak || Spacewatch || PAD || align=right | 3.6 km || 
|-id=683 bgcolor=#E9E9E9
| 192683 ||  || — || September 29, 1999 || Anderson Mesa || LONEOS || GER || align=right | 4.5 km || 
|-id=684 bgcolor=#E9E9E9
| 192684 ||  || — || October 6, 1999 || Višnjan Observatory || K. Korlević, M. Jurić || — || align=right | 4.4 km || 
|-id=685 bgcolor=#E9E9E9
| 192685 ||  || — || October 7, 1999 || Črni Vrh || Črni Vrh || — || align=right | 4.4 km || 
|-id=686 bgcolor=#FA8072
| 192686 Aljuroma ||  ||  || October 15, 1999 || Bornheim || N. Ehring || — || align=right | 3.5 km || 
|-id=687 bgcolor=#E9E9E9
| 192687 ||  || — || October 7, 1999 || Goodricke-Pigott || R. A. Tucker || — || align=right | 3.5 km || 
|-id=688 bgcolor=#E9E9E9
| 192688 ||  || — || October 3, 1999 || Kitt Peak || Spacewatch || — || align=right | 2.2 km || 
|-id=689 bgcolor=#E9E9E9
| 192689 ||  || — || October 3, 1999 || Socorro || LINEAR || — || align=right | 2.8 km || 
|-id=690 bgcolor=#E9E9E9
| 192690 ||  || — || October 4, 1999 || Socorro || LINEAR || IAN || align=right | 2.4 km || 
|-id=691 bgcolor=#E9E9E9
| 192691 ||  || — || October 3, 1999 || Catalina || CSS || — || align=right | 3.9 km || 
|-id=692 bgcolor=#E9E9E9
| 192692 ||  || — || October 2, 1999 || Kitt Peak || Spacewatch || — || align=right | 2.8 km || 
|-id=693 bgcolor=#E9E9E9
| 192693 ||  || — || October 3, 1999 || Kitt Peak || Spacewatch || — || align=right | 1.4 km || 
|-id=694 bgcolor=#E9E9E9
| 192694 ||  || — || October 3, 1999 || Kitt Peak || Spacewatch || AGN || align=right | 1.6 km || 
|-id=695 bgcolor=#E9E9E9
| 192695 ||  || — || October 4, 1999 || Kitt Peak || Spacewatch || — || align=right | 2.1 km || 
|-id=696 bgcolor=#E9E9E9
| 192696 ||  || — || October 6, 1999 || Kitt Peak || Spacewatch || AGN || align=right | 1.9 km || 
|-id=697 bgcolor=#E9E9E9
| 192697 ||  || — || October 7, 1999 || Kitt Peak || Spacewatch || — || align=right | 2.6 km || 
|-id=698 bgcolor=#E9E9E9
| 192698 ||  || — || October 7, 1999 || Kitt Peak || Spacewatch || WIT || align=right | 1.2 km || 
|-id=699 bgcolor=#E9E9E9
| 192699 ||  || — || October 7, 1999 || Kitt Peak || Spacewatch || — || align=right | 3.4 km || 
|-id=700 bgcolor=#E9E9E9
| 192700 ||  || — || October 7, 1999 || Kitt Peak || Spacewatch || PAD || align=right | 2.1 km || 
|}

192701–192800 

|-bgcolor=#E9E9E9
| 192701 ||  || — || October 7, 1999 || Kitt Peak || Spacewatch || — || align=right | 3.9 km || 
|-id=702 bgcolor=#d6d6d6
| 192702 ||  || — || October 8, 1999 || Kitt Peak || Spacewatch || KAR || align=right | 1.6 km || 
|-id=703 bgcolor=#E9E9E9
| 192703 ||  || — || October 10, 1999 || Kitt Peak || Spacewatch || NEM || align=right | 3.6 km || 
|-id=704 bgcolor=#E9E9E9
| 192704 ||  || — || October 11, 1999 || Kitt Peak || Spacewatch || — || align=right | 4.5 km || 
|-id=705 bgcolor=#E9E9E9
| 192705 ||  || — || October 12, 1999 || Kitt Peak || Spacewatch || — || align=right | 2.0 km || 
|-id=706 bgcolor=#E9E9E9
| 192706 ||  || — || October 2, 1999 || Socorro || LINEAR || — || align=right | 4.2 km || 
|-id=707 bgcolor=#E9E9E9
| 192707 ||  || — || October 2, 1999 || Socorro || LINEAR || — || align=right | 2.8 km || 
|-id=708 bgcolor=#E9E9E9
| 192708 ||  || — || October 2, 1999 || Socorro || LINEAR || — || align=right | 1.9 km || 
|-id=709 bgcolor=#E9E9E9
| 192709 ||  || — || October 3, 1999 || Socorro || LINEAR || — || align=right | 2.7 km || 
|-id=710 bgcolor=#E9E9E9
| 192710 ||  || — || October 4, 1999 || Socorro || LINEAR || IAN || align=right | 1.5 km || 
|-id=711 bgcolor=#E9E9E9
| 192711 ||  || — || October 4, 1999 || Socorro || LINEAR || — || align=right | 4.8 km || 
|-id=712 bgcolor=#E9E9E9
| 192712 ||  || — || October 4, 1999 || Socorro || LINEAR || — || align=right | 3.1 km || 
|-id=713 bgcolor=#E9E9E9
| 192713 ||  || — || October 4, 1999 || Socorro || LINEAR || — || align=right | 3.4 km || 
|-id=714 bgcolor=#E9E9E9
| 192714 ||  || — || October 4, 1999 || Socorro || LINEAR || — || align=right | 2.8 km || 
|-id=715 bgcolor=#E9E9E9
| 192715 ||  || — || October 4, 1999 || Socorro || LINEAR || — || align=right | 4.2 km || 
|-id=716 bgcolor=#E9E9E9
| 192716 ||  || — || October 6, 1999 || Socorro || LINEAR || — || align=right | 3.8 km || 
|-id=717 bgcolor=#E9E9E9
| 192717 ||  || — || October 6, 1999 || Socorro || LINEAR || — || align=right | 2.5 km || 
|-id=718 bgcolor=#E9E9E9
| 192718 ||  || — || October 6, 1999 || Socorro || LINEAR || — || align=right | 2.5 km || 
|-id=719 bgcolor=#E9E9E9
| 192719 ||  || — || October 6, 1999 || Socorro || LINEAR || AGN || align=right | 2.1 km || 
|-id=720 bgcolor=#E9E9E9
| 192720 ||  || — || October 6, 1999 || Socorro || LINEAR || — || align=right | 4.0 km || 
|-id=721 bgcolor=#E9E9E9
| 192721 ||  || — || October 7, 1999 || Socorro || LINEAR || — || align=right | 4.0 km || 
|-id=722 bgcolor=#E9E9E9
| 192722 ||  || — || October 7, 1999 || Socorro || LINEAR || — || align=right | 4.5 km || 
|-id=723 bgcolor=#E9E9E9
| 192723 ||  || — || October 7, 1999 || Socorro || LINEAR || CLO || align=right | 2.7 km || 
|-id=724 bgcolor=#E9E9E9
| 192724 ||  || — || October 9, 1999 || Socorro || LINEAR || — || align=right | 3.8 km || 
|-id=725 bgcolor=#E9E9E9
| 192725 ||  || — || October 9, 1999 || Socorro || LINEAR || — || align=right | 2.1 km || 
|-id=726 bgcolor=#E9E9E9
| 192726 ||  || — || October 9, 1999 || Socorro || LINEAR || — || align=right | 3.4 km || 
|-id=727 bgcolor=#E9E9E9
| 192727 ||  || — || October 10, 1999 || Socorro || LINEAR || — || align=right | 3.1 km || 
|-id=728 bgcolor=#E9E9E9
| 192728 ||  || — || October 10, 1999 || Socorro || LINEAR || HEN || align=right | 1.9 km || 
|-id=729 bgcolor=#E9E9E9
| 192729 ||  || — || October 11, 1999 || Socorro || LINEAR || — || align=right | 2.4 km || 
|-id=730 bgcolor=#E9E9E9
| 192730 ||  || — || October 12, 1999 || Socorro || LINEAR || — || align=right | 3.0 km || 
|-id=731 bgcolor=#E9E9E9
| 192731 ||  || — || October 12, 1999 || Socorro || LINEAR || — || align=right | 4.0 km || 
|-id=732 bgcolor=#E9E9E9
| 192732 ||  || — || October 12, 1999 || Socorro || LINEAR || — || align=right | 3.7 km || 
|-id=733 bgcolor=#E9E9E9
| 192733 ||  || — || October 12, 1999 || Socorro || LINEAR || — || align=right | 4.8 km || 
|-id=734 bgcolor=#E9E9E9
| 192734 ||  || — || October 12, 1999 || Socorro || LINEAR || — || align=right | 3.5 km || 
|-id=735 bgcolor=#E9E9E9
| 192735 ||  || — || October 12, 1999 || Socorro || LINEAR || — || align=right | 3.6 km || 
|-id=736 bgcolor=#E9E9E9
| 192736 ||  || — || October 13, 1999 || Socorro || LINEAR || — || align=right | 1.7 km || 
|-id=737 bgcolor=#E9E9E9
| 192737 ||  || — || October 13, 1999 || Socorro || LINEAR || GEF || align=right | 2.5 km || 
|-id=738 bgcolor=#E9E9E9
| 192738 ||  || — || October 15, 1999 || Socorro || LINEAR || — || align=right | 4.1 km || 
|-id=739 bgcolor=#E9E9E9
| 192739 ||  || — || October 15, 1999 || Socorro || LINEAR || AER || align=right | 2.5 km || 
|-id=740 bgcolor=#E9E9E9
| 192740 ||  || — || October 15, 1999 || Socorro || LINEAR || WIT || align=right | 1.7 km || 
|-id=741 bgcolor=#E9E9E9
| 192741 ||  || — || October 15, 1999 || Socorro || LINEAR || — || align=right | 2.9 km || 
|-id=742 bgcolor=#E9E9E9
| 192742 ||  || — || October 15, 1999 || Socorro || LINEAR || — || align=right | 3.9 km || 
|-id=743 bgcolor=#E9E9E9
| 192743 ||  || — || October 2, 1999 || Kitt Peak || Spacewatch || — || align=right | 2.7 km || 
|-id=744 bgcolor=#E9E9E9
| 192744 ||  || — || October 2, 1999 || Kitt Peak || Spacewatch || — || align=right | 3.1 km || 
|-id=745 bgcolor=#E9E9E9
| 192745 ||  || — || October 3, 1999 || Kitt Peak || Spacewatch || — || align=right | 3.4 km || 
|-id=746 bgcolor=#E9E9E9
| 192746 ||  || — || October 4, 1999 || Kitt Peak || Spacewatch || POS || align=right | 5.6 km || 
|-id=747 bgcolor=#E9E9E9
| 192747 ||  || — || October 4, 1999 || Kitt Peak || Spacewatch || — || align=right | 3.1 km || 
|-id=748 bgcolor=#E9E9E9
| 192748 ||  || — || October 9, 1999 || Catalina || CSS || — || align=right | 4.9 km || 
|-id=749 bgcolor=#E9E9E9
| 192749 ||  || — || October 9, 1999 || Catalina || CSS || — || align=right | 2.6 km || 
|-id=750 bgcolor=#E9E9E9
| 192750 ||  || — || October 11, 1999 || Kitt Peak || Spacewatch || HOF || align=right | 2.8 km || 
|-id=751 bgcolor=#E9E9E9
| 192751 ||  || — || October 9, 1999 || Kitt Peak || Spacewatch || HEN || align=right | 1.7 km || 
|-id=752 bgcolor=#E9E9E9
| 192752 ||  || — || October 9, 1999 || Socorro || LINEAR || — || align=right | 3.9 km || 
|-id=753 bgcolor=#E9E9E9
| 192753 ||  || — || October 9, 1999 || Socorro || LINEAR || — || align=right | 3.3 km || 
|-id=754 bgcolor=#E9E9E9
| 192754 ||  || — || October 15, 1999 || Kitt Peak || Spacewatch || — || align=right | 3.0 km || 
|-id=755 bgcolor=#E9E9E9
| 192755 ||  || — || October 3, 1999 || Socorro || LINEAR || — || align=right | 3.6 km || 
|-id=756 bgcolor=#E9E9E9
| 192756 ||  || — || October 3, 1999 || Socorro || LINEAR || DOR || align=right | 4.3 km || 
|-id=757 bgcolor=#E9E9E9
| 192757 ||  || — || October 3, 1999 || Socorro || LINEAR || — || align=right | 2.8 km || 
|-id=758 bgcolor=#E9E9E9
| 192758 ||  || — || October 3, 1999 || Socorro || LINEAR || GEF || align=right | 2.5 km || 
|-id=759 bgcolor=#E9E9E9
| 192759 ||  || — || October 8, 1999 || Socorro || LINEAR || MIT || align=right | 4.1 km || 
|-id=760 bgcolor=#E9E9E9
| 192760 ||  || — || October 10, 1999 || Socorro || LINEAR || GEF || align=right | 2.1 km || 
|-id=761 bgcolor=#E9E9E9
| 192761 ||  || — || October 12, 1999 || Socorro || LINEAR || — || align=right | 5.6 km || 
|-id=762 bgcolor=#E9E9E9
| 192762 ||  || — || October 12, 1999 || Socorro || LINEAR || — || align=right | 3.6 km || 
|-id=763 bgcolor=#E9E9E9
| 192763 ||  || — || October 2, 1999 || Kitt Peak || Spacewatch || MRX || align=right | 1.7 km || 
|-id=764 bgcolor=#E9E9E9
| 192764 ||  || — || October 3, 1999 || Catalina || CSS || — || align=right | 3.1 km || 
|-id=765 bgcolor=#E9E9E9
| 192765 ||  || — || October 9, 1999 || Socorro || LINEAR || — || align=right | 2.5 km || 
|-id=766 bgcolor=#E9E9E9
| 192766 ||  || — || October 9, 1999 || Socorro || LINEAR || — || align=right | 1.6 km || 
|-id=767 bgcolor=#E9E9E9
| 192767 ||  || — || October 9, 1999 || Kitt Peak || Spacewatch || MIS || align=right | 3.4 km || 
|-id=768 bgcolor=#E9E9E9
| 192768 ||  || — || October 10, 1999 || Socorro || LINEAR || GEF || align=right | 2.2 km || 
|-id=769 bgcolor=#E9E9E9
| 192769 ||  || — || October 11, 1999 || Kitt Peak || Spacewatch || AGN || align=right | 2.1 km || 
|-id=770 bgcolor=#E9E9E9
| 192770 ||  || — || October 8, 1999 || Anderson Mesa || LONEOS || — || align=right | 4.0 km || 
|-id=771 bgcolor=#E9E9E9
| 192771 ||  || — || October 29, 1999 || Kitt Peak || Spacewatch || — || align=right | 2.5 km || 
|-id=772 bgcolor=#E9E9E9
| 192772 ||  || — || October 31, 1999 || Bergisch Gladbach || W. Bickel || AGN || align=right | 1.9 km || 
|-id=773 bgcolor=#E9E9E9
| 192773 ||  || — || October 29, 1999 || Kitt Peak || Spacewatch || MRX || align=right | 1.6 km || 
|-id=774 bgcolor=#E9E9E9
| 192774 ||  || — || October 29, 1999 || Catalina || CSS || — || align=right | 2.2 km || 
|-id=775 bgcolor=#E9E9E9
| 192775 ||  || — || October 29, 1999 || Catalina || CSS || — || align=right | 2.9 km || 
|-id=776 bgcolor=#E9E9E9
| 192776 ||  || — || October 29, 1999 || Catalina || CSS || — || align=right | 3.5 km || 
|-id=777 bgcolor=#E9E9E9
| 192777 ||  || — || October 30, 1999 || Kitt Peak || Spacewatch || HEN || align=right | 1.3 km || 
|-id=778 bgcolor=#E9E9E9
| 192778 ||  || — || October 31, 1999 || Kitt Peak || Spacewatch || — || align=right | 2.3 km || 
|-id=779 bgcolor=#E9E9E9
| 192779 ||  || — || October 28, 1999 || Catalina || CSS || CLO || align=right | 4.5 km || 
|-id=780 bgcolor=#E9E9E9
| 192780 ||  || — || October 28, 1999 || Catalina || CSS || INO || align=right | 1.7 km || 
|-id=781 bgcolor=#E9E9E9
| 192781 ||  || — || October 28, 1999 || Catalina || CSS || — || align=right | 2.1 km || 
|-id=782 bgcolor=#E9E9E9
| 192782 ||  || — || October 30, 1999 || Catalina || CSS || — || align=right | 2.4 km || 
|-id=783 bgcolor=#E9E9E9
| 192783 ||  || — || October 30, 1999 || Catalina || CSS || MRX || align=right | 1.9 km || 
|-id=784 bgcolor=#E9E9E9
| 192784 ||  || — || October 30, 1999 || Kitt Peak || Spacewatch || — || align=right | 2.8 km || 
|-id=785 bgcolor=#E9E9E9
| 192785 ||  || — || October 31, 1999 || Kitt Peak || Spacewatch || — || align=right | 2.5 km || 
|-id=786 bgcolor=#E9E9E9
| 192786 ||  || — || October 31, 1999 || Kitt Peak || Spacewatch || MRX || align=right | 1.2 km || 
|-id=787 bgcolor=#E9E9E9
| 192787 ||  || — || October 31, 1999 || Kitt Peak || Spacewatch || HOF || align=right | 2.5 km || 
|-id=788 bgcolor=#E9E9E9
| 192788 ||  || — || October 31, 1999 || Kitt Peak || Spacewatch || — || align=right | 2.8 km || 
|-id=789 bgcolor=#E9E9E9
| 192789 ||  || — || October 31, 1999 || Kitt Peak || Spacewatch || — || align=right | 3.2 km || 
|-id=790 bgcolor=#E9E9E9
| 192790 ||  || — || October 31, 1999 || Kitt Peak || Spacewatch || — || align=right | 1.9 km || 
|-id=791 bgcolor=#E9E9E9
| 192791 ||  || — || October 19, 1999 || Kitt Peak || Spacewatch || GEF || align=right | 2.3 km || 
|-id=792 bgcolor=#E9E9E9
| 192792 ||  || — || October 31, 1999 || Catalina || CSS || — || align=right | 4.5 km || 
|-id=793 bgcolor=#E9E9E9
| 192793 ||  || — || October 19, 1999 || Kitt Peak || Spacewatch || AGN || align=right | 1.6 km || 
|-id=794 bgcolor=#E9E9E9
| 192794 ||  || — || October 19, 1999 || Kitt Peak || Spacewatch || — || align=right | 2.3 km || 
|-id=795 bgcolor=#E9E9E9
| 192795 ||  || — || October 19, 1999 || Kitt Peak || Spacewatch || — || align=right | 1.9 km || 
|-id=796 bgcolor=#E9E9E9
| 192796 ||  || — || October 28, 1999 || Catalina || CSS || GEF || align=right | 2.5 km || 
|-id=797 bgcolor=#E9E9E9
| 192797 ||  || — || October 28, 1999 || Catalina || CSS || — || align=right | 4.9 km || 
|-id=798 bgcolor=#E9E9E9
| 192798 ||  || — || October 30, 1999 || Kitt Peak || Spacewatch || — || align=right | 3.5 km || 
|-id=799 bgcolor=#E9E9E9
| 192799 ||  || — || November 4, 1999 || Powell || Powell Obs. || — || align=right | 2.6 km || 
|-id=800 bgcolor=#E9E9E9
| 192800 ||  || — || November 1, 1999 || Catalina || CSS || — || align=right | 2.5 km || 
|}

192801–192900 

|-bgcolor=#E9E9E9
| 192801 ||  || — || November 1, 1999 || Catalina || CSS || MRX || align=right | 2.0 km || 
|-id=802 bgcolor=#E9E9E9
| 192802 ||  || — || November 2, 1999 || Kitt Peak || Spacewatch || HNA || align=right | 4.0 km || 
|-id=803 bgcolor=#E9E9E9
| 192803 ||  || — || November 10, 1999 || Višnjan Observatory || K. Korlević || AEO || align=right | 1.9 km || 
|-id=804 bgcolor=#E9E9E9
| 192804 ||  || — || November 3, 1999 || Socorro || LINEAR || — || align=right | 3.5 km || 
|-id=805 bgcolor=#E9E9E9
| 192805 ||  || — || November 4, 1999 || Catalina || CSS || — || align=right | 3.0 km || 
|-id=806 bgcolor=#E9E9E9
| 192806 ||  || — || November 4, 1999 || Catalina || CSS || — || align=right | 5.3 km || 
|-id=807 bgcolor=#E9E9E9
| 192807 ||  || — || November 4, 1999 || Socorro || LINEAR || — || align=right | 2.6 km || 
|-id=808 bgcolor=#E9E9E9
| 192808 ||  || — || November 4, 1999 || Socorro || LINEAR || AEO || align=right | 1.7 km || 
|-id=809 bgcolor=#E9E9E9
| 192809 ||  || — || November 4, 1999 || Socorro || LINEAR || — || align=right | 2.9 km || 
|-id=810 bgcolor=#E9E9E9
| 192810 ||  || — || November 4, 1999 || Socorro || LINEAR || — || align=right | 3.5 km || 
|-id=811 bgcolor=#E9E9E9
| 192811 ||  || — || November 4, 1999 || Socorro || LINEAR || — || align=right | 3.2 km || 
|-id=812 bgcolor=#E9E9E9
| 192812 ||  || — || November 4, 1999 || Socorro || LINEAR || — || align=right | 2.6 km || 
|-id=813 bgcolor=#E9E9E9
| 192813 ||  || — || November 4, 1999 || Socorro || LINEAR || HNA || align=right | 4.4 km || 
|-id=814 bgcolor=#d6d6d6
| 192814 ||  || — || November 4, 1999 || Socorro || LINEAR || — || align=right | 4.5 km || 
|-id=815 bgcolor=#d6d6d6
| 192815 ||  || — || November 5, 1999 || Kitt Peak || Spacewatch || — || align=right | 3.0 km || 
|-id=816 bgcolor=#E9E9E9
| 192816 ||  || — || November 5, 1999 || Kitt Peak || Spacewatch || — || align=right | 2.8 km || 
|-id=817 bgcolor=#E9E9E9
| 192817 ||  || — || November 4, 1999 || Socorro || LINEAR || — || align=right | 2.2 km || 
|-id=818 bgcolor=#E9E9E9
| 192818 ||  || — || November 4, 1999 || Socorro || LINEAR || — || align=right | 3.3 km || 
|-id=819 bgcolor=#E9E9E9
| 192819 ||  || — || November 5, 1999 || Socorro || LINEAR || NEM || align=right | 4.2 km || 
|-id=820 bgcolor=#E9E9E9
| 192820 ||  || — || November 5, 1999 || Socorro || LINEAR || POS || align=right | 5.0 km || 
|-id=821 bgcolor=#E9E9E9
| 192821 ||  || — || November 1, 1999 || Kitt Peak || Spacewatch || ADE || align=right | 4.2 km || 
|-id=822 bgcolor=#E9E9E9
| 192822 ||  || — || November 4, 1999 || Socorro || LINEAR || AST || align=right | 4.1 km || 
|-id=823 bgcolor=#E9E9E9
| 192823 ||  || — || November 4, 1999 || Socorro || LINEAR || GEF || align=right | 2.0 km || 
|-id=824 bgcolor=#E9E9E9
| 192824 ||  || — || November 5, 1999 || Socorro || LINEAR || — || align=right | 4.1 km || 
|-id=825 bgcolor=#E9E9E9
| 192825 ||  || — || November 7, 1999 || Socorro || LINEAR || — || align=right | 4.9 km || 
|-id=826 bgcolor=#E9E9E9
| 192826 ||  || — || November 9, 1999 || Socorro || LINEAR || — || align=right | 4.6 km || 
|-id=827 bgcolor=#E9E9E9
| 192827 ||  || — || November 9, 1999 || Socorro || LINEAR || — || align=right | 3.5 km || 
|-id=828 bgcolor=#E9E9E9
| 192828 ||  || — || November 9, 1999 || Socorro || LINEAR || — || align=right | 3.1 km || 
|-id=829 bgcolor=#E9E9E9
| 192829 ||  || — || November 9, 1999 || Socorro || LINEAR || — || align=right | 3.3 km || 
|-id=830 bgcolor=#E9E9E9
| 192830 ||  || — || November 9, 1999 || Socorro || LINEAR || — || align=right | 4.3 km || 
|-id=831 bgcolor=#E9E9E9
| 192831 ||  || — || November 9, 1999 || Socorro || LINEAR || — || align=right | 2.9 km || 
|-id=832 bgcolor=#E9E9E9
| 192832 ||  || — || November 9, 1999 || Socorro || LINEAR || — || align=right | 2.7 km || 
|-id=833 bgcolor=#E9E9E9
| 192833 ||  || — || November 9, 1999 || Socorro || LINEAR || — || align=right | 2.0 km || 
|-id=834 bgcolor=#E9E9E9
| 192834 ||  || — || November 9, 1999 || Kitt Peak || Spacewatch || — || align=right | 4.1 km || 
|-id=835 bgcolor=#E9E9E9
| 192835 ||  || — || November 9, 1999 || Kitt Peak || Spacewatch || — || align=right | 3.4 km || 
|-id=836 bgcolor=#E9E9E9
| 192836 ||  || — || November 4, 1999 || Kitt Peak || Spacewatch || AGN || align=right | 1.6 km || 
|-id=837 bgcolor=#E9E9E9
| 192837 ||  || — || November 6, 1999 || Kitt Peak || Spacewatch || — || align=right | 3.5 km || 
|-id=838 bgcolor=#E9E9E9
| 192838 ||  || — || November 9, 1999 || Kitt Peak || Spacewatch || NEM || align=right | 2.6 km || 
|-id=839 bgcolor=#E9E9E9
| 192839 ||  || — || November 9, 1999 || Kitt Peak || Spacewatch || — || align=right | 2.7 km || 
|-id=840 bgcolor=#E9E9E9
| 192840 ||  || — || November 12, 1999 || Socorro || LINEAR || AGN || align=right | 2.2 km || 
|-id=841 bgcolor=#E9E9E9
| 192841 ||  || — || November 9, 1999 || Kitt Peak || Spacewatch || — || align=right | 3.2 km || 
|-id=842 bgcolor=#E9E9E9
| 192842 ||  || — || November 13, 1999 || Kitt Peak || Spacewatch || — || align=right | 2.8 km || 
|-id=843 bgcolor=#E9E9E9
| 192843 ||  || — || November 14, 1999 || Socorro || LINEAR || — || align=right | 4.0 km || 
|-id=844 bgcolor=#E9E9E9
| 192844 ||  || — || November 9, 1999 || Kitt Peak || Spacewatch || AEO || align=right | 1.7 km || 
|-id=845 bgcolor=#E9E9E9
| 192845 ||  || — || November 13, 1999 || Kitt Peak || Spacewatch || MIS || align=right | 4.2 km || 
|-id=846 bgcolor=#E9E9E9
| 192846 ||  || — || November 15, 1999 || Kitt Peak || Spacewatch || — || align=right | 3.4 km || 
|-id=847 bgcolor=#E9E9E9
| 192847 ||  || — || November 12, 1999 || Socorro || LINEAR || INO || align=right | 2.5 km || 
|-id=848 bgcolor=#E9E9E9
| 192848 ||  || — || November 12, 1999 || Socorro || LINEAR || — || align=right | 4.3 km || 
|-id=849 bgcolor=#E9E9E9
| 192849 ||  || — || November 14, 1999 || Socorro || LINEAR || — || align=right | 2.7 km || 
|-id=850 bgcolor=#E9E9E9
| 192850 ||  || — || November 14, 1999 || Socorro || LINEAR || — || align=right | 3.3 km || 
|-id=851 bgcolor=#E9E9E9
| 192851 ||  || — || November 10, 1999 || Kitt Peak || Spacewatch || — || align=right | 5.4 km || 
|-id=852 bgcolor=#E9E9E9
| 192852 ||  || — || November 2, 1999 || Catalina || CSS || BAR || align=right | 2.3 km || 
|-id=853 bgcolor=#E9E9E9
| 192853 ||  || — || November 5, 1999 || Socorro || LINEAR || WIT || align=right | 1.8 km || 
|-id=854 bgcolor=#E9E9E9
| 192854 ||  || — || November 6, 1999 || Socorro || LINEAR || BAR || align=right | 2.2 km || 
|-id=855 bgcolor=#E9E9E9
| 192855 ||  || — || November 15, 1999 || Socorro || LINEAR || DOR || align=right | 4.1 km || 
|-id=856 bgcolor=#E9E9E9
| 192856 ||  || — || November 15, 1999 || Socorro || LINEAR || — || align=right | 4.2 km || 
|-id=857 bgcolor=#E9E9E9
| 192857 ||  || — || November 3, 1999 || Catalina || CSS || — || align=right | 4.4 km || 
|-id=858 bgcolor=#E9E9E9
| 192858 ||  || — || November 3, 1999 || Socorro || LINEAR || CLO || align=right | 3.6 km || 
|-id=859 bgcolor=#d6d6d6
| 192859 ||  || — || November 12, 1999 || Socorro || LINEAR || KOR || align=right | 1.5 km || 
|-id=860 bgcolor=#E9E9E9
| 192860 ||  || — || November 5, 1999 || Kitt Peak || Spacewatch || — || align=right | 3.5 km || 
|-id=861 bgcolor=#E9E9E9
| 192861 ||  || — || November 3, 1999 || Socorro || LINEAR || — || align=right | 2.8 km || 
|-id=862 bgcolor=#E9E9E9
| 192862 ||  || — || November 5, 1999 || Socorro || LINEAR || INO || align=right | 1.9 km || 
|-id=863 bgcolor=#E9E9E9
| 192863 ||  || — || November 29, 1999 || Kitt Peak || Spacewatch || — || align=right | 3.2 km || 
|-id=864 bgcolor=#E9E9E9
| 192864 ||  || — || November 30, 1999 || Chiyoda || T. Kojima || — || align=right | 4.6 km || 
|-id=865 bgcolor=#E9E9E9
| 192865 ||  || — || November 29, 1999 || Kitt Peak || Spacewatch || — || align=right | 3.7 km || 
|-id=866 bgcolor=#E9E9E9
| 192866 ||  || — || November 30, 1999 || Kitt Peak || Spacewatch || — || align=right | 3.3 km || 
|-id=867 bgcolor=#E9E9E9
| 192867 ||  || — || November 30, 1999 || Kitt Peak || Spacewatch || PAD || align=right | 3.0 km || 
|-id=868 bgcolor=#d6d6d6
| 192868 ||  || — || November 30, 1999 || Kitt Peak || Spacewatch || KAR || align=right | 1.4 km || 
|-id=869 bgcolor=#E9E9E9
| 192869 ||  || — || December 5, 1999 || Socorro || LINEAR || — || align=right | 2.9 km || 
|-id=870 bgcolor=#E9E9E9
| 192870 ||  || — || December 3, 1999 || Socorro || LINEAR || — || align=right | 4.5 km || 
|-id=871 bgcolor=#E9E9E9
| 192871 ||  || — || December 5, 1999 || Socorro || LINEAR || — || align=right | 2.7 km || 
|-id=872 bgcolor=#E9E9E9
| 192872 ||  || — || December 6, 1999 || Socorro || LINEAR || — || align=right | 4.9 km || 
|-id=873 bgcolor=#E9E9E9
| 192873 ||  || — || December 6, 1999 || Socorro || LINEAR || — || align=right | 4.8 km || 
|-id=874 bgcolor=#E9E9E9
| 192874 ||  || — || December 6, 1999 || Socorro || LINEAR || GEF || align=right | 4.7 km || 
|-id=875 bgcolor=#E9E9E9
| 192875 ||  || — || December 6, 1999 || Socorro || LINEAR || AEO || align=right | 2.2 km || 
|-id=876 bgcolor=#E9E9E9
| 192876 ||  || — || December 7, 1999 || Socorro || LINEAR || — || align=right | 4.0 km || 
|-id=877 bgcolor=#E9E9E9
| 192877 ||  || — || December 7, 1999 || Socorro || LINEAR || AEO || align=right | 1.9 km || 
|-id=878 bgcolor=#E9E9E9
| 192878 ||  || — || December 7, 1999 || Socorro || LINEAR || — || align=right | 3.7 km || 
|-id=879 bgcolor=#E9E9E9
| 192879 ||  || — || December 7, 1999 || Socorro || LINEAR || — || align=right | 3.9 km || 
|-id=880 bgcolor=#E9E9E9
| 192880 ||  || — || December 7, 1999 || Socorro || LINEAR || — || align=right | 4.3 km || 
|-id=881 bgcolor=#E9E9E9
| 192881 ||  || — || December 7, 1999 || Socorro || LINEAR || — || align=right | 4.5 km || 
|-id=882 bgcolor=#E9E9E9
| 192882 ||  || — || December 7, 1999 || Socorro || LINEAR || MAR || align=right | 1.8 km || 
|-id=883 bgcolor=#E9E9E9
| 192883 ||  || — || December 7, 1999 || Socorro || LINEAR || — || align=right | 4.5 km || 
|-id=884 bgcolor=#E9E9E9
| 192884 ||  || — || December 7, 1999 || Socorro || LINEAR || — || align=right | 4.7 km || 
|-id=885 bgcolor=#E9E9E9
| 192885 ||  || — || December 7, 1999 || Socorro || LINEAR || HNS || align=right | 2.4 km || 
|-id=886 bgcolor=#E9E9E9
| 192886 ||  || — || December 7, 1999 || Socorro || LINEAR || — || align=right | 5.6 km || 
|-id=887 bgcolor=#E9E9E9
| 192887 ||  || — || December 3, 1999 || Nachi-Katsuura || Y. Shimizu, T. Urata || — || align=right | 5.4 km || 
|-id=888 bgcolor=#E9E9E9
| 192888 ||  || — || December 11, 1999 || Socorro || LINEAR || — || align=right | 4.8 km || 
|-id=889 bgcolor=#E9E9E9
| 192889 ||  || — || December 11, 1999 || Socorro || LINEAR || — || align=right | 5.0 km || 
|-id=890 bgcolor=#E9E9E9
| 192890 ||  || — || December 5, 1999 || Catalina || CSS || — || align=right | 3.3 km || 
|-id=891 bgcolor=#E9E9E9
| 192891 ||  || — || December 5, 1999 || Catalina || CSS || — || align=right | 5.3 km || 
|-id=892 bgcolor=#E9E9E9
| 192892 ||  || — || December 5, 1999 || Catalina || CSS || — || align=right | 3.8 km || 
|-id=893 bgcolor=#E9E9E9
| 192893 ||  || — || December 7, 1999 || Catalina || CSS || — || align=right | 3.1 km || 
|-id=894 bgcolor=#E9E9E9
| 192894 ||  || — || December 12, 1999 || Socorro || LINEAR || — || align=right | 3.0 km || 
|-id=895 bgcolor=#E9E9E9
| 192895 ||  || — || December 5, 1999 || Socorro || LINEAR || — || align=right | 2.9 km || 
|-id=896 bgcolor=#E9E9E9
| 192896 ||  || — || December 2, 1999 || Kitt Peak || Spacewatch || — || align=right | 3.5 km || 
|-id=897 bgcolor=#E9E9E9
| 192897 ||  || — || December 12, 1999 || Socorro || LINEAR || — || align=right | 7.3 km || 
|-id=898 bgcolor=#E9E9E9
| 192898 ||  || — || December 7, 1999 || Kitt Peak || Spacewatch || — || align=right | 3.6 km || 
|-id=899 bgcolor=#E9E9E9
| 192899 ||  || — || December 7, 1999 || Kitt Peak || Spacewatch || — || align=right | 3.8 km || 
|-id=900 bgcolor=#d6d6d6
| 192900 ||  || — || December 7, 1999 || Kitt Peak || Spacewatch || — || align=right | 3.9 km || 
|}

192901–193000 

|-bgcolor=#d6d6d6
| 192901 ||  || — || December 7, 1999 || Kitt Peak || Spacewatch || — || align=right | 4.4 km || 
|-id=902 bgcolor=#E9E9E9
| 192902 ||  || — || December 8, 1999 || Socorro || LINEAR || CLO || align=right | 3.6 km || 
|-id=903 bgcolor=#E9E9E9
| 192903 ||  || — || December 10, 1999 || Socorro || LINEAR || — || align=right | 3.9 km || 
|-id=904 bgcolor=#E9E9E9
| 192904 ||  || — || December 12, 1999 || Socorro || LINEAR || — || align=right | 3.8 km || 
|-id=905 bgcolor=#E9E9E9
| 192905 ||  || — || December 13, 1999 || Socorro || LINEAR || — || align=right | 4.7 km || 
|-id=906 bgcolor=#E9E9E9
| 192906 ||  || — || December 14, 1999 || Socorro || LINEAR || CLO || align=right | 4.7 km || 
|-id=907 bgcolor=#E9E9E9
| 192907 ||  || — || December 14, 1999 || Socorro || LINEAR || — || align=right | 3.9 km || 
|-id=908 bgcolor=#E9E9E9
| 192908 ||  || — || December 13, 1999 || Kitt Peak || Spacewatch || AEO || align=right | 1.3 km || 
|-id=909 bgcolor=#d6d6d6
| 192909 ||  || — || December 15, 1999 || Kitt Peak || Spacewatch || — || align=right | 3.6 km || 
|-id=910 bgcolor=#E9E9E9
| 192910 ||  || — || December 2, 1999 || Anderson Mesa || LONEOS || — || align=right | 4.8 km || 
|-id=911 bgcolor=#d6d6d6
| 192911 ||  || — || December 5, 1999 || Kitt Peak || Spacewatch || — || align=right | 3.8 km || 
|-id=912 bgcolor=#E9E9E9
| 192912 ||  || — || December 5, 1999 || Socorro || LINEAR || — || align=right | 3.3 km || 
|-id=913 bgcolor=#E9E9E9
| 192913 ||  || — || December 5, 1999 || Kitt Peak || Spacewatch || HOF || align=right | 3.3 km || 
|-id=914 bgcolor=#E9E9E9
| 192914 ||  || — || December 6, 1999 || Socorro || LINEAR || DOR || align=right | 4.4 km || 
|-id=915 bgcolor=#d6d6d6
| 192915 ||  || — || December 5, 1999 || Kitt Peak || Spacewatch || KOR || align=right | 1.7 km || 
|-id=916 bgcolor=#E9E9E9
| 192916 ||  || — || December 7, 1999 || Catalina || CSS || — || align=right | 4.2 km || 
|-id=917 bgcolor=#E9E9E9
| 192917 ||  || — || December 19, 1999 || Socorro || LINEAR || GAL || align=right | 3.2 km || 
|-id=918 bgcolor=#E9E9E9
| 192918 ||  || — || December 27, 1999 || Kitt Peak || Spacewatch || HOF || align=right | 4.5 km || 
|-id=919 bgcolor=#E9E9E9
| 192919 ||  || — || December 27, 1999 || Kitt Peak || Spacewatch || — || align=right | 2.7 km || 
|-id=920 bgcolor=#E9E9E9
| 192920 ||  || — || December 27, 1999 || Kitt Peak || Spacewatch || HOF || align=right | 3.2 km || 
|-id=921 bgcolor=#E9E9E9
| 192921 ||  || — || December 27, 1999 || Kitt Peak || Spacewatch || XIZ || align=right | 1.9 km || 
|-id=922 bgcolor=#E9E9E9
| 192922 ||  || — || December 30, 1999 || Socorro || LINEAR || — || align=right | 2.7 km || 
|-id=923 bgcolor=#E9E9E9
| 192923 ||  || — || December 30, 1999 || Monte Agliale || S. Donati || — || align=right | 4.4 km || 
|-id=924 bgcolor=#d6d6d6
| 192924 ||  || — || December 30, 1999 || Mauna Kea || C. Veillet || — || align=right | 4.9 km || 
|-id=925 bgcolor=#d6d6d6
| 192925 ||  || — || December 27, 1999 || Kitt Peak || Spacewatch || — || align=right | 3.0 km || 
|-id=926 bgcolor=#E9E9E9
| 192926 ||  || — || January 4, 2000 || Višnjan Observatory || K. Korlević || — || align=right | 2.9 km || 
|-id=927 bgcolor=#d6d6d6
| 192927 ||  || — || January 3, 2000 || San Marcello || A. Boattini, G. Forti || — || align=right | 3.8 km || 
|-id=928 bgcolor=#E9E9E9
| 192928 ||  || — || January 5, 2000 || Kleť || Kleť Obs. || — || align=right | 3.4 km || 
|-id=929 bgcolor=#C2FFFF
| 192929 ||  || — || January 5, 2000 || Kitt Peak || Spacewatch || L4ERY || align=right | 13 km || 
|-id=930 bgcolor=#E9E9E9
| 192930 ||  || — || January 4, 2000 || Socorro || LINEAR || JUN || align=right | 1.7 km || 
|-id=931 bgcolor=#E9E9E9
| 192931 ||  || — || January 5, 2000 || Socorro || LINEAR || PAE || align=right | 5.4 km || 
|-id=932 bgcolor=#E9E9E9
| 192932 ||  || — || January 2, 2000 || Socorro || LINEAR || GAL || align=right | 3.2 km || 
|-id=933 bgcolor=#E9E9E9
| 192933 ||  || — || January 5, 2000 || Socorro || LINEAR || — || align=right | 3.6 km || 
|-id=934 bgcolor=#d6d6d6
| 192934 ||  || — || January 5, 2000 || Socorro || LINEAR || — || align=right | 6.2 km || 
|-id=935 bgcolor=#E9E9E9
| 192935 ||  || — || January 7, 2000 || Socorro || LINEAR || — || align=right | 4.2 km || 
|-id=936 bgcolor=#E9E9E9
| 192936 ||  || — || January 2, 2000 || Socorro || LINEAR || — || align=right | 3.8 km || 
|-id=937 bgcolor=#E9E9E9
| 192937 ||  || — || January 7, 2000 || Socorro || LINEAR || CLO || align=right | 3.5 km || 
|-id=938 bgcolor=#C2FFFF
| 192938 ||  || — || January 7, 2000 || Socorro || LINEAR || L4 || align=right | 15 km || 
|-id=939 bgcolor=#E9E9E9
| 192939 ||  || — || January 8, 2000 || Socorro || LINEAR || INO || align=right | 2.3 km || 
|-id=940 bgcolor=#E9E9E9
| 192940 ||  || — || January 3, 2000 || Kitt Peak || Spacewatch || HOF || align=right | 5.0 km || 
|-id=941 bgcolor=#d6d6d6
| 192941 ||  || — || January 3, 2000 || Kitt Peak || Spacewatch || — || align=right | 4.0 km || 
|-id=942 bgcolor=#C2FFFF
| 192942 ||  || — || January 8, 2000 || Kitt Peak || Spacewatch || L4 || align=right | 11 km || 
|-id=943 bgcolor=#E9E9E9
| 192943 ||  || — || January 9, 2000 || Kitt Peak || Spacewatch || — || align=right | 2.3 km || 
|-id=944 bgcolor=#d6d6d6
| 192944 ||  || — || January 12, 2000 || Kitt Peak || Spacewatch || — || align=right | 3.5 km || 
|-id=945 bgcolor=#d6d6d6
| 192945 ||  || — || January 10, 2000 || Kitt Peak || Spacewatch || — || align=right | 3.2 km || 
|-id=946 bgcolor=#E9E9E9
| 192946 ||  || — || January 3, 2000 || Socorro || LINEAR || — || align=right | 4.0 km || 
|-id=947 bgcolor=#d6d6d6
| 192947 ||  || — || January 2, 2000 || Kitt Peak || Spacewatch || THM || align=right | 3.7 km || 
|-id=948 bgcolor=#fefefe
| 192948 || 2000 BA || — || January 16, 2000 || Prescott || P. G. Comba || — || align=right | 1.0 km || 
|-id=949 bgcolor=#d6d6d6
| 192949 ||  || — || January 27, 2000 || Kitt Peak || Spacewatch || — || align=right | 5.1 km || 
|-id=950 bgcolor=#d6d6d6
| 192950 ||  || — || January 28, 2000 || Socorro || LINEAR || — || align=right | 5.8 km || 
|-id=951 bgcolor=#d6d6d6
| 192951 ||  || — || January 29, 2000 || Socorro || LINEAR || EOS || align=right | 3.3 km || 
|-id=952 bgcolor=#FA8072
| 192952 ||  || — || January 30, 2000 || Socorro || LINEAR || — || align=right | 1.4 km || 
|-id=953 bgcolor=#fefefe
| 192953 ||  || — || January 29, 2000 || Kitt Peak || Spacewatch || — || align=right | 1.1 km || 
|-id=954 bgcolor=#d6d6d6
| 192954 ||  || — || January 30, 2000 || Kitt Peak || Spacewatch || CHA || align=right | 3.5 km || 
|-id=955 bgcolor=#fefefe
| 192955 ||  || — || January 27, 2000 || Kitt Peak || Spacewatch || — || align=right data-sort-value="0.97" | 970 m || 
|-id=956 bgcolor=#E9E9E9
| 192956 ||  || — || February 2, 2000 || Socorro || LINEAR || DOR || align=right | 3.7 km || 
|-id=957 bgcolor=#d6d6d6
| 192957 ||  || — || February 2, 2000 || Socorro || LINEAR || — || align=right | 3.9 km || 
|-id=958 bgcolor=#E9E9E9
| 192958 ||  || — || February 1, 2000 || Kitt Peak || Spacewatch || — || align=right | 3.7 km || 
|-id=959 bgcolor=#d6d6d6
| 192959 ||  || — || February 7, 2000 || Kitt Peak || Spacewatch || — || align=right | 4.1 km || 
|-id=960 bgcolor=#d6d6d6
| 192960 ||  || — || February 7, 2000 || Kitt Peak || Spacewatch || — || align=right | 4.2 km || 
|-id=961 bgcolor=#fefefe
| 192961 ||  || — || February 4, 2000 || Socorro || LINEAR || — || align=right | 1.4 km || 
|-id=962 bgcolor=#d6d6d6
| 192962 ||  || — || February 12, 2000 || Kitt Peak || Spacewatch || — || align=right | 2.9 km || 
|-id=963 bgcolor=#fefefe
| 192963 ||  || — || February 6, 2000 || Socorro || LINEAR || — || align=right | 1.4 km || 
|-id=964 bgcolor=#C2FFFF
| 192964 ||  || — || February 2, 2000 || Socorro || LINEAR || L4 || align=right | 15 km || 
|-id=965 bgcolor=#fefefe
| 192965 ||  || — || February 3, 2000 || Kitt Peak || Spacewatch || — || align=right | 1.1 km || 
|-id=966 bgcolor=#C2FFFF
| 192966 ||  || — || February 6, 2000 || Kitt Peak || Spacewatch || L4 || align=right | 12 km || 
|-id=967 bgcolor=#d6d6d6
| 192967 ||  || — || February 26, 2000 || Kitt Peak || Spacewatch || — || align=right | 4.9 km || 
|-id=968 bgcolor=#d6d6d6
| 192968 ||  || — || February 26, 2000 || Kitt Peak || Spacewatch || EOS || align=right | 2.3 km || 
|-id=969 bgcolor=#fefefe
| 192969 ||  || — || February 26, 2000 || Kitt Peak || Spacewatch || — || align=right | 1.0 km || 
|-id=970 bgcolor=#d6d6d6
| 192970 ||  || — || February 26, 2000 || Kitt Peak || Spacewatch || — || align=right | 3.1 km || 
|-id=971 bgcolor=#d6d6d6
| 192971 ||  || — || February 28, 2000 || Kitt Peak || Spacewatch || HYG || align=right | 4.5 km || 
|-id=972 bgcolor=#E9E9E9
| 192972 ||  || — || February 29, 2000 || Socorro || LINEAR || MRX || align=right | 1.8 km || 
|-id=973 bgcolor=#d6d6d6
| 192973 ||  || — || February 29, 2000 || Socorro || LINEAR || — || align=right | 3.4 km || 
|-id=974 bgcolor=#fefefe
| 192974 ||  || — || February 29, 2000 || Socorro || LINEAR || — || align=right | 1.1 km || 
|-id=975 bgcolor=#d6d6d6
| 192975 ||  || — || February 29, 2000 || Socorro || LINEAR || — || align=right | 3.7 km || 
|-id=976 bgcolor=#d6d6d6
| 192976 ||  || — || February 29, 2000 || Socorro || LINEAR || — || align=right | 4.1 km || 
|-id=977 bgcolor=#fefefe
| 192977 ||  || — || February 29, 2000 || Socorro || LINEAR || — || align=right | 1.4 km || 
|-id=978 bgcolor=#d6d6d6
| 192978 ||  || — || February 29, 2000 || Socorro || LINEAR || HYG || align=right | 3.1 km || 
|-id=979 bgcolor=#d6d6d6
| 192979 ||  || — || February 29, 2000 || Socorro || LINEAR || EOS || align=right | 3.1 km || 
|-id=980 bgcolor=#E9E9E9
| 192980 ||  || — || February 29, 2000 || Socorro || LINEAR || — || align=right | 2.6 km || 
|-id=981 bgcolor=#fefefe
| 192981 ||  || — || February 29, 2000 || Socorro || LINEAR || FLO || align=right data-sort-value="0.87" | 870 m || 
|-id=982 bgcolor=#d6d6d6
| 192982 ||  || — || February 29, 2000 || Socorro || LINEAR || — || align=right | 5.5 km || 
|-id=983 bgcolor=#fefefe
| 192983 ||  || — || February 29, 2000 || Socorro || LINEAR || NYS || align=right | 2.3 km || 
|-id=984 bgcolor=#d6d6d6
| 192984 ||  || — || February 29, 2000 || Socorro || LINEAR || — || align=right | 4.2 km || 
|-id=985 bgcolor=#d6d6d6
| 192985 ||  || — || February 29, 2000 || Socorro || LINEAR || — || align=right | 6.3 km || 
|-id=986 bgcolor=#d6d6d6
| 192986 ||  || — || February 29, 2000 || Socorro || LINEAR || — || align=right | 4.6 km || 
|-id=987 bgcolor=#d6d6d6
| 192987 ||  || — || February 29, 2000 || Socorro || LINEAR || — || align=right | 4.8 km || 
|-id=988 bgcolor=#d6d6d6
| 192988 ||  || — || February 29, 2000 || Socorro || LINEAR || — || align=right | 2.9 km || 
|-id=989 bgcolor=#d6d6d6
| 192989 ||  || — || February 29, 2000 || Socorro || LINEAR || — || align=right | 3.9 km || 
|-id=990 bgcolor=#d6d6d6
| 192990 ||  || — || February 29, 2000 || Socorro || LINEAR || TEL || align=right | 2.2 km || 
|-id=991 bgcolor=#fefefe
| 192991 ||  || — || February 29, 2000 || Socorro || LINEAR || FLO || align=right data-sort-value="0.96" | 960 m || 
|-id=992 bgcolor=#d6d6d6
| 192992 ||  || — || February 29, 2000 || Socorro || LINEAR || — || align=right | 3.9 km || 
|-id=993 bgcolor=#d6d6d6
| 192993 ||  || — || February 27, 2000 || Kitt Peak || Spacewatch || KAR || align=right | 1.4 km || 
|-id=994 bgcolor=#d6d6d6
| 192994 ||  || — || February 27, 2000 || Kitt Peak || Spacewatch || EOS || align=right | 2.3 km || 
|-id=995 bgcolor=#fefefe
| 192995 ||  || — || February 28, 2000 || Kitt Peak || Spacewatch || — || align=right data-sort-value="0.72" | 720 m || 
|-id=996 bgcolor=#fefefe
| 192996 ||  || — || February 29, 2000 || Socorro || LINEAR || FLO || align=right | 1.1 km || 
|-id=997 bgcolor=#fefefe
| 192997 ||  || — || February 29, 2000 || Socorro || LINEAR || — || align=right | 1.2 km || 
|-id=998 bgcolor=#d6d6d6
| 192998 ||  || — || February 25, 2000 || Uccle || T. Pauwels || — || align=right | 3.5 km || 
|-id=999 bgcolor=#d6d6d6
| 192999 ||  || — || February 29, 2000 || Socorro || LINEAR || — || align=right | 6.1 km || 
|-id=000 bgcolor=#d6d6d6
| 193000 ||  || — || February 25, 2000 || Kitt Peak || Spacewatch || THM || align=right | 3.4 km || 
|}

References

External links 
 Discovery Circumstances: Numbered Minor Planets (190001)–(195000) (IAU Minor Planet Center)

0192